= Convex Polytopes =

1967 mathematics textbook

- Title page for Convex Polytopes (1967)
- Author: Branko Grünbaum
- Publisher: John Wiley & Sons
- Publication date: 1967

Convex Polytopes is a graduate-level mathematics textbook about convex polytopes, higher-dimensional generalizations of three-dimensional convex polyhedra. It was written by Branko Grünbaum, with contributions from Victor Klee, Micha Perles, and G. C. Shephard, and published in 1967 by John Wiley & Sons. It went out of print in 1970. A second edition, prepared with the assistance of Volker Kaibel, Victor Klee, and Günter M. Ziegler, was published by Springer-Verlag in 2003, as volume 221 of their book series Graduate Texts in Mathematics.

Convex Polytopes was the winner of the 2005 Leroy P. Steele Prize for mathematical exposition, given by the American Mathematical Society. The Basic Library List Committee of the Mathematical Association of America has recommended its inclusion in undergraduate mathematics libraries.

== Topics ==
The book has 19 chapters. After two chapters introducing background material in linear algebra, topology, and convex geometry, two more chapters provide basic definitions of polyhedra, in their two dual versions (intersections of half-spaces and convex hulls of finite point sets), introduce Schlegel diagrams, and provide some basic examples including the cyclic polytopes. Chapter 5 introduces Gale diagrams, and the next two chapters use them to study polytopes with a number of vertices only slightly higher than their dimension, and neighborly polytopes.

Chapters 8 through 11 study the numbers of faces of different dimensions in polytopes through Euler's polyhedral formula, the Dehn–Sommerville equations, and the extremal combinatorics of numbers of faces in polytopes. Chapter 11 connects the low-dimensional faces together into the skeleton of a polytope, and proves the van Kampen–Flores theorem about non-embeddability of skeletons into lower-dimensional spaces. Chapter 12 studies the question of when a skeleton uniquely determines the higher-dimensional combinatorial structure of its polytope. Chapter 13 provides a complete answer to this theorem for three-dimensional convex polytopes via Steinitz's theorem, which characterizes the graphs of convex polyhedra combinatorially and can be used to show that they can only be realized as a convex polyhedron in one way. It also touches on the multisets of face sizes that can be realized as polyhedra (Eberhard's theorem) and on the combinatorial types of polyhedra that can have inscribed spheres or circumscribed spheres.

Chapter 14 concerns relations analogous to the Dehn–Sommerville equations for sums of angles of polytopes, and uses sums of angles to define a central point, the "Steiner point", for any polytope. Chapter 15 studies Minkowski addition and Blaschke addition, two operations by which polytopes can be combined to produce other polytopes. Chapters 16 and 17 study shortest paths and the Hirsch conjecture, longest paths and Hamiltonian cycles, and the shortness exponent of polytopes. Chapter 18 studies arrangements of hyperplanes and their dual relation to the combinatorial structure of zonotopes. A concluding chapter, chapter 19, also includes material on the symmetries of polytopes.

Exercises throughout the book make it usable as a textbook, and provide additional links to recent research, and the later chapters of the book also list many open research problems. The second edition of the book keeps the content, organization, and pagination of the first edition intact, adding to it notes at the ends of each chapter on updates to the material in that chapter. These updates include material on Mnëv's universality theorem and its relation to the realizability of polytopes from their combinatorial structures, the proof of the $g$-conjecture for simplicial spheres, and Kalai's 3^{d} conjecture. The second edition also provides an improved bibliography.

Topics that are important to the theory of convex polytopes but not well-covered in the book Convex Polytopes include Hilbert's third problem and the theory of Dehn invariants.

== Audience and reception ==
Although written at a graduate level, the main prerequisites for reading the book are linear algebra and general topology, both at an undergraduate level.

In a review of the first edition of the book, Werner Fenchel calls it "a remarkable achievement", "a wealth of material", "well organized and presented in a lucid style". Over 35 years later, in giving the Steele Prize to Grünbaum for Convex Polytopes, the American Mathematical Society wrote that the book "has served both as a standard reference and as an inspiration", that it was in large part responsible for the vibrant ongoing research in polyhedral combinatorics, and that it remained relevant to this area. Reviewing and welcoming the second edition, Peter McMullen wrote that despite being "immediately rendered obsolete" by the research that it sparked, the book was still essential reading for researchers in this area.

== See also ==
- List of books about polyhedra
