= Combinatorial commutative algebra =

Field of mathematics using techniques from combinatorics and commutative algebra

Combinatorial commutative algebra is a relatively new, rapidly developing mathematical discipline. As the name implies, it lies at the intersection of two more established fields, commutative algebra and combinatorics, and frequently uses methods of one to address problems arising in the other. Less obviously, polyhedral geometry plays a significant role.

One of the milestones in the development of the subject was Richard Stanley's 1975 proof of the Upper Bound Conjecture for simplicial spheres, which was based on earlier work of Melvin Hochster and Gerald Reisner. While the problem can be formulated purely in geometric terms, the methods of the proof drew on commutative algebra techniques.

A signature theorem in combinatorial commutative algebra is the characterization of h-vectors of simplicial polytopes conjectured in 1970 by Peter McMullen. Known as the g-theorem, it was proved in 1979 by Stanley (necessity of the conditions, algebraic argument) and by Louis Billera and Carl W. Lee (sufficiency, combinatorial and geometric construction). A major open question was the extension of this characterization from simplicial polytopes to simplicial spheres, the g-conjecture, which was resolved in 2018 by Karim Adiprasito.

== Important notions of combinatorial commutative algebra ==
- Square-free monomial ideal in a polynomial ring and Stanley–Reisner ring of a simplicial complex.
- Cohen–Macaulay rings.
- Monomial ring, closely related to an affine semigroup ring and to the coordinate ring of an affine toric variety.
- Algebra with a straightening law. There are several versions of those, including Hodge algebras of Corrado de Concini, David Eisenbud, and Claudio Procesi.

== See also ==
- Algebraic combinatorics
- Polyhedral combinatorics
- Zero-divisor graph
