= Cyclic polytope =

Convex hull of points on moment curve

In mathematics, a cyclic polytope, denoted C(n, d), is a convex polytope formed as a convex hull of n distinct points on a rational normal curve in R^{d}, where n is greater than d. These polytopes were studied by Constantin Carathéodory, David Gale, Theodore Motzkin, Victor Klee, and others. They play an important role in polyhedral combinatorics: according to the upper bound theorem, proved by Peter McMullen and Richard Stanley, the boundary Δ(n,d) of the cyclic polytope C(n,d) maximizes the number f_{i} of i-dimensional faces among all simplicial spheres of dimension d − 1 with n vertices.

== Definition ==
The moment curve in $\mathbb{R}^d$ is defined by

$$\mathbf{x}:\mathbb{R} \rightarrow \mathbb{R}^d, \mathbf{x}(t) := \begin{bmatrix}t,t^2,\ldots,t^d\end{bmatrix}^T$$.

The $d$-dimensional cyclic polytope with $n$ vertices is the convex hull

$$C(n,d) := \mathbf{conv}\{\mathbf{x}(t_1),\mathbf{x}(t_2),\ldots,\mathbf{x}(t_n) \}$$

of $n > d \ge 2$ distinct points $\mathbf{x}(t_i)$ with $t_1 < t_2 < \ldots < t_n$ on the moment curve.

The combinatorial structure of this polytope is independent of the points chosen, and the resulting polytope has dimension d and n vertices. Its boundary is a (d − 1)-dimensional simplicial polytope denoted Δ(n,d).

== Gale evenness condition ==
The Gale evenness condition provides a necessary and sufficient condition to determine a facet on a cyclic polytope.

Let $T := \{t_1,t_2,\ldots,t_n\}$. Then, a $d$-subset $T_d \subseteq T$ forms a facet of $C(n,d)$ if and only if any two elements in $T \setminus T_d$ are separated by an even number of elements from $T_d$ in the sequence $(t_1,t_2,\ldots,t_n)$.

== Neighborliness ==
Cyclic polytopes are examples of neighborly polytopes, in that every set of at most d/2 vertices forms a face. They were the first neighborly polytopes known, and Theodore Motzkin conjectured that all neighborly polytopes are combinatorially equivalent to cyclic polytopes, but this is now known to be false.

== Number of faces ==
The number of i-dimensional faces of the cyclic polytope Δ(n,d) is given by the formula

$$f_i(\Delta(n,d)) = \binom{n}{i+1} \quad \textrm{for} \quad
0 \leq i < \left\lfloor\frac{d}{2}\right\rfloor$$

and $(f_0,\ldots,f_{\left\lfloor\frac{d}{2}\right\rfloor-1})$ completely determine $(f_{\left\lfloor\frac{d}{2}\right\rfloor},\ldots,f_{d-1})$ via the Dehn–Sommerville equations.

== Upper bound theorem ==
The upper bound theorem states that cyclic polytopes have the maximum possible number of faces for a given dimension and number of vertices: if Δ is a simplicial sphere of dimension d − 1 with n vertices, then

$$f_i(\Delta) \leq f_i(\Delta(n,d)) \quad \textrm{for}\quad i=0,1,\ldots,d-1.$$

The upper bound conjecture for simplicial polytopes was proposed by Theodore Motzkin in 1957 and proved by Peter McMullen in 1970. Victor Klee suggested that the same statement should hold for all simplicial spheres and this was indeed established in 1975 by Richard P. Stanley using the notion of a Stanley–Reisner ring and homological methods.

== See also ==
- Combinatorial commutative algebra
