= Gram–Euler theorem =

In geometry, the Gram–Euler theorem, Gram-Sommerville, Brianchon-Gram or Gram relation (named after Jørgen Pedersen Gram, Leonhard Euler, Duncan Sommerville and Charles Julien Brianchon) is a generalization of the internal angle sum formula of polygons to higher-dimensional polytopes. The equation constrains the sums of the interior angles of a polytope in a manner analogous to the Euler relation on the number of d-dimensional faces.

== Statement ==
Let $P$ be an $n$-dimensional convex polytope. For each k-face $F$, with $k = \dim(F)$ its dimension (0 for vertices, 1 for edges, 2 for faces, etc., up to n for P itself), its interior (higher-dimensional) solid angle $\angle(F)$ is defined by choosing a small enough $(n - 1)$-sphere centered at some point in the interior of $F$ and finding the surface area contained inside $P$. Then the Gram–Euler theorem states:
$$\sum_{F \subset P} (-1)^{\dim F} \angle(F) = 0$$
In non-Euclidean geometry of constant curvature (i.e. spherical, $\epsilon = 1$, and hyperbolic, $\epsilon = -1$, geometry) the relation gains a volume term, but only if the dimension n is even:
$$\sum_{F \subset P} (-1)^{\dim F} \angle(F) = \epsilon^{n/2}(1 + (-1)^n)\operatorname{Vol}(P)$$
Here, $\operatorname{Vol}(P)$ is the normalized (hyper)volume of the polytope (i.e, the fraction of the n-dimensional spherical or hyperbolic space); the angles $\angle(F)$ also have to be expressed as fractions (of the (n-1)-sphere).

When the polytope is simplicial additional angle restrictions known as Perles relations hold, analogous to the Dehn-Sommerville equations for the number of faces.

== Examples ==
For a two-dimensional polygon, the statement expands into:
$$\sum_{v} \alpha_v - \sum_e \pi + 2\pi = 0$$
where the first term $A=\textstyle\sum \alpha_v$ is the sum of the internal vertex angles, the second sum is over the edges, each of which has internal angle $\pi$, and the final term corresponds to the entire polygon, which has a full internal angle $2\pi$. For a polygon with $n$ faces, the theorem tells us that $A - \pi n + 2\pi = 0$, or equivalently, $A = \pi (n - 2)$. For a polygon on a sphere, the relation gives the spherical surface area or solid angle as the spherical excess: $\Omega = A - \pi (n - 2)$.

For a three-dimensional polyhedron the theorem reads:
$$\sum_{v} \Omega_v - 2\sum_e \theta_e + \sum_f 2\pi - 4\pi = 0$$
where $\Omega_v$ is the solid angle at a vertex, $\theta_e$ the dihedral angle at an edge (the solid angle of the corresponding lune is twice as big), the third sum counts the faces (each with an interior hemisphere angle of $2\pi$) and the last term is the interior solid angle (full sphere or $4\pi$).

== History ==
The n-dimensional relation was first proven by Sommerville, Heckman and Grünbaum for the spherical, hyperbolic and Euclidean case, respectively.

== See also ==
- Euler characteristic
- Dehn–Sommerville equations
- Angular defect
- Gauss–Bonnet theorem
