= H-vector =

In algebraic combinatorics, the h-vector of a simplicial polytope is a fundamental invariant of the polytope which encodes the number of faces of different dimensions and allows one to express the Dehn–Sommerville equations in a particularly simple form. A characterization of the set of h-vectors of simplicial polytopes was conjectured by Peter McMullen and proved by Lou Billera and Carl W. Lee and Richard Stanley (g-theorem). The definition of h-vector applies to arbitrary abstract simplicial complexes. The g-conjecture stated that for simplicial spheres, all possible h-vectors occur already among the h-vectors of the boundaries of convex simplicial polytopes. It was proven in December 2018 by Karim Adiprasito.

Stanley introduced a generalization of the h-vector, the toric h-vector, which is defined for an arbitrary ranked poset, and proved that for the class of Eulerian posets, the Dehn–Sommerville equations continue to hold. A different, more combinatorial, generalization of the h-vector that has been extensively studied is the flag h-vector of a ranked poset. For Eulerian posets, it can be more concisely expressed by means of a noncommutative polynomial in two variables called the cd-index.

== Definition ==
Let Δ be an abstract simplicial complex of dimension d − 1 with f_{i} i-dimensional faces and f_{−1} = 1. These numbers are arranged into the f-vector of Δ,

$$f(\Delta)=(f_{-1},f_0,\ldots,f_{d-1}).$$

An important special case occurs when Δ is the boundary of a d-dimensional convex polytope.

For k = 0, 1, …, d, let

$$h_k = \sum_{i=0}^k (-1)^{k-i}\binom{d-i}{k-i}f_{i-1}.$$

The tuple

$$h(\Delta)=(h_0,h_1,\ldots,h_d)$$

is called the h-vector of Δ. In particular, $h_{0} = 1$, $h_{1} = f_{0} - d$, and $h_{d} = (-1)^{d} (1 - \chi(\Delta))$, where $\chi(\Delta)$ is the Euler characteristic of $\Delta$. The f-vector and the h-vector uniquely determine each other through the linear relation

$$\sum_{i=0}^{d}f_{i-1}(t-1)^{d-i}= \sum_{k=0}^{d}h_{k}t^{d-k},$$

from which it follows that, for $i = 0, \dotsc, d$,

$$f_{i-1} = \sum_{k=0}^i \binom{d-k}{i-k} h_{k}.$$

In particular, $f_{d-1} = h_{0} + h_{1} + \dotsb + h_{d}$. Let R = k[Δ] be the Stanley–Reisner ring of Δ. Then its Hilbert–Poincaré series can be expressed as

$$P_{R}(t)=\sum_{i=0}^{d}\frac{f_{i-1}t^i}{(1-t)^{i}}=
\frac{h_0+h_1t+\cdots+h_d t^d}{(1-t)^d}.$$

This motivates the definition of the h-vector of a finitely generated positively graded algebra of Krull dimension d as the numerator of its Hilbert–Poincaré series written with the denominator (1 − t)^{d}.

The h-vector is closely related to the h^{*}-vector for a convex lattice polytope, see Ehrhart polynomial.

== Recurrence relation ==
The $\textstyle h$-vector $(h_{0}, h_{1}, \dotsc, h_{d})$ can be computed from the $\textstyle f$-vector $(f_{-1}, f_{0}, \dotsc, f_{d-1})$ by using the recurrence relation

$$h^{i}_{0} = 1, \qquad  -1 \le i \le d$$
$$h^{i}_{i+1} = f_{i}, \qquad -1 \le i \le d-1$$
$$h^{i}_{k} = h^{i-1}_{k} - h^{i-1}_{k-1}, \qquad 1 \le k \le i \le d$$.

and finally setting $\textstyle h_{k} = h^{d}_{k}$ for $\textstyle 0 \le k \le d$. For small examples, one can use this method to compute $\textstyle h$-vectors quickly by hand by recursively filling the entries of an array similar to Pascal's triangle. For example, consider the boundary complex $\textstyle \Delta$ of an octahedron. The $\textstyle f$-vector of $\textstyle \Delta$ is $\textstyle (1, 6, 12, 8)$. To compute the $\textstyle h$-vector of $\Delta$, construct a triangular array by first writing $d+2$ $\textstyle 1$s down the left edge and the $\textstyle f$-vector down the right edge.

$$\begin{matrix} &  &  &  & 1 &  &  &   \\ &  &  & 1 &  & 6 &  &   \\ &  & 1 &  &   &  & 12 &   \\ & 1 &  &   &  &   &  & 8  \\ 1 &  &   &  &   &  &   &  & 0 \end{matrix}$$

(We set $f_{d} = 0$ just to make the array triangular.) Then, starting from the top, fill each remaining entry by subtracting its upper-left neighbor from its upper-right neighbor. In this way, we generate the following array:

$$\begin{matrix} &  &  &  & 1 &  &  &   \\ &  &  & 1 &  & 6 &  &   \\ &  & 1 &  & 5 &  & 12 &   \\ & 1 &  & 4 &  & 7 &  & 8  \\ 1 &  & 3 &  & 3 &  & 1 & & 0 \end{matrix}$$

The entries of the bottom row (apart from the final $0$) are the entries of the $\textstyle h$-vector. Hence, the $\textstyle h$-vector of $\textstyle \Delta$ is $\textstyle (1, 3, 3, 1)$.

== Toric h-vector ==
To an arbitrary graded poset P, Stanley associated a pair of polynomials f(P,x) and g(P,x). Their definition is recursive in terms of the polynomials associated to intervals [0,y] for all y ∈ P, y ≠ 1, viewed as ranked posets of lower rank (0 and 1 denote the minimal and the maximal elements of P). The coefficients of f(P,x) form the toric h-vector of P. When P is an Eulerian poset of rank d + 1 such that P − 1 is simplicial, the toric h-vector coincides with the ordinary h-vector constructed using the numbers f_{i} of elements of P − 1 of given rank i + 1. In this case the toric h-vector of P satisfies the Dehn–Sommerville equations

$$h_k = h_{d-k}.$$

The reason for the adjective "toric" is a connection of the toric h-vector with the intersection cohomology of a certain projective toric variety X whenever P is the boundary complex of rational convex polytope. Namely, the components are the dimensions of the even intersection cohomology groups of X:

$$h_k = \dim_{\mathbb{Q}} \operatorname{IH}^{2k}(X,\mathbb{Q})$$

(the odd intersection cohomology groups of X are all zero). The Dehn–Sommerville equations are a manifestation of the Poincaré duality in the intersection cohomology of X. Kalle Karu proved that the toric h-vector of a polytope is unimodal, regardless of whether the polytope is rational or not.

== Flag h-vector and cd-index ==
A different generalization of the notions of f-vector and h-vector of a convex polytope has been extensively studied. Let $P$ be a finite graded poset of rank n, so that each maximal chain in $P$ has length n. For any $S$, a subset of $\left\{0, \ldots, n\right\}$, let $\alpha_P(S)$ denote the number of chains in $P$ whose ranks constitute the set $S$. More formally, let

$$rk: P\to\{0,1,\ldots,n\}$$

be the rank function of $P$ and let $P_S$ be the $S$-rank selected subposet, which consists of the elements from $P$ whose rank is in $S$:

$$P_S=\{x\in P: rk(x)\in S\}.$$

Then $\alpha_P(S)$ is the number of the maximal chains in $P_S$ and the function

$$S \mapsto \alpha_P(S)$$

is called the flag f-vector of P. The function

$$S \mapsto \beta_P(S), \quad
\beta_P(S) = \sum_{T \subseteq S} (-1)^{|S|-|T|} \alpha_P(S)$$

is called the flag h-vector of $P$. By the inclusion–exclusion principle,

$$\alpha_P(S) = \sum_{T\subseteq S}\beta_P(T).$$

The flag f- and h-vectors of $P$ refine the ordinary f- and h-vectors of its order complex $\Delta(P)$:

$$f_{i-1}(\Delta(P)) = \sum_{|S|=i} \alpha_P(S), \quad
h_{i}(\Delta(P)) = \sum_{|S|=i} \beta_P(S).$$

The flag h-vector of $P$ can be displayed via a polynomial in noncommutative variables a and b. For any subset $S$ of {1,…,n}, define the corresponding monomial in a and b,

$$u_S = u_1 \cdots u_n, \quad
u_i=a \text{ for } i\notin S, u_i=b \text{ for } i\in S.$$

Then the noncommutative generating function for the flag h-vector of P is defined by

$$\Psi_P(a,b) = \sum_{S} \beta_P(S) u_{S}.$$

From the relation between α_{P}(S) and β_{P}(S), the noncommutative generating function for the flag f-vector of P is

$$\Psi_P(a,a+b) = \sum_{S} \alpha_P(S) u_{S}.$$

Margaret Bayer and Louis Billera determined the most general linear relations that hold between the components of the flag h-vector of an Eulerian poset P.

Fine noted an elegant way to state these relations: there exists a noncommutative polynomial Φ_{P}(c,d), called the cd-index of P, such that

$$\Psi_P(a,b) = \Phi_P(a+b, ab+ba).$$

Stanley proved that all coefficients of the cd-index of the boundary complex of a convex polytope are non-negative. He conjectured that this positivity phenomenon persists for a more general class of Eulerian posets that Stanley calls Gorenstein* complexes and which includes simplicial spheres and complete fans. This conjecture was proved by Kalle Karu. The combinatorial meaning of these non-negative coefficients (an answer to the question "what do they count?") remains unclear.
