= Upper bound theorem =

In mathematics, the upper bound theorem states that cyclic polytopes have the largest possible number of faces among all convex polytopes with a given dimension and number of vertices. It is one of the central results of polyhedral combinatorics.

Originally known as the upper bound conjecture, this statement was formulated by Theodore Motzkin, proved in 1970 by Peter McMullen, and strengthened from polytopes to subdivisions of a sphere in 1975 by Richard P. Stanley.

== Cyclic polytopes ==
The cyclic polytope $\Delta(n,d)$ may be defined as the convex hull of $n$ vertices on the moment curve, the set of $d$-dimensional points with coordinates $(t,t^2,t^3,\dots)$. The precise choice of which $n$ points on this curve are selected is irrelevant for the combinatorial structure of this polytope. The number of $i$-dimensional faces of $\Delta(n,d)$ is given by the formula
$$f_i(\Delta(n,d)) = \binom{n}{i+1} \quad \textrm{for} \quad
0 \leq i < \left\lfloor\frac{d}{2}\right\rfloor$$

and $(f_0,\ldots,f_{\left\lfloor\frac{d}{2}\right\rfloor-1})$ completely determine $(f_{\left\lfloor\frac{d}{2}\right\rfloor},\ldots,f_{d-1})$ via the Dehn–Sommerville equations. The same formula for the number of faces holds more generally for any neighborly polytope.

== Statement ==
The upper bound theorem states that if $\Delta$ is a simplicial sphere of dimension $d-1$ with $n$ vertices, then
$$f_i(\Delta) \leq f_i(\Delta(n,d)) \quad \textrm{for}\quad i=0,1,\ldots,d-1.$$
The difference between $d-1$ for the dimension of the simplicial sphere, and $d$ for the dimension of the cyclic polytope, comes from the fact that the surface of a $d$-dimensional polytope (such as the cyclic polytope) is a $(d-1)$-dimensional subdivision of a sphere. Therefore, the upper bound theorem implies that the number of faces of an arbitrary polytope can never be more than the number of faces of a cyclic or neighborly polytope with the same dimension and number of vertices. Asymptotically, this implies that there are at most $\scriptstyle O(n^{\lfloor d/2\rfloor})$ faces of all dimensions. The same bounds hold as well for convex polytopes that are not simplicial, as perturbing the vertices of such a polytope (and taking the convex hull of the perturbed vertices) can only increase the number of faces.

== History ==
The upper bound conjecture for simplicial polytopes was proposed by Motzkin in 1957 and proved by McMullen in 1970. A key ingredient in his proof was the following reformulation in terms of h-vectors:

$$h_i(\Delta) \leq \tbinom{n-d+i-1}{i} \quad
\textrm{for} \quad
0 \leq i \leq \left\lfloor\frac{d}{2}\right\rfloor.$$

Victor Klee suggested that the same statement should hold for all simplicial spheres and this was indeed established in 1975 by Stanley using the notion of a Stanley–Reisner ring and homological methods. For a nice historical account of this theorem see Stanley's article "How the upper bound conjecture was proved".
