= Duncan Sommerville =

Scottish mathematician and astronomer (1879–1934)

Duncan M. Y. Sommerville
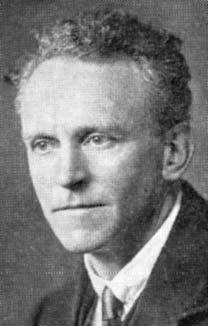
- Duncan Sommerville
- Born: 24 November 1879; Beawar, Rajputana, India
- Died: 31 January 1934 (aged 54); Wellington, New Zealand
- Citizenship: United Kingdom
- Education: St Andrews University
- Known for: Textbooks on geometry Dehn-Sommerville relations
- Scientific career
- Fields: Mathematics
- Workplaces: St Andrews University (1904–13); Wellington University (1913–34)

Duncan MacLaren Young Sommerville (1879–1934) was a Scottish mathematician and astronomer. He compiled a bibliography on non-Euclidean geometry and also wrote a leading textbook in that field. He also wrote Introduction to the Geometry of N Dimensions, advancing the study of polytopes. He was a co-founder and the first secretary of the New Zealand Astronomical Society.

Sommerville was also an accomplished watercolourist, producing a series of New Zealand landscapes.

The middle name 'MacLaren' is spelt using the old orthography M'Laren in some sources, for example the records of the Royal Society of Edinburgh.

== Early life ==
Sommerville was born on 24 November 1879 in Beawar in India, where his father, the Rev Dr James Sommerville, was employed as a missionary by the United Presbyterian Church of Scotland. His father had been responsible for establishing the hospital at Jodhpur, Rajputana.

The family returned home to Perth, Scotland, where Duncan spent 4 years at a private school, before completing his education at Perth Academy. His father died in his youth. He lived with his mother at 12 Rose Terrace. Despite his father's death, he won a scholarship, allowing him to continue his studies to university level.

He then studied mathematics at the University of St Andrews in Fife, graduating MA in 1902. He then began as an assistant lecturer at the university. In 1905 he gained his doctorate (DSc) for his thesis Networks of the Plane in Absolute Geometry and was promoted to lecturer. He continued teaching mathematics at St Andrews until 1915.

In projective geometry the method of Cayley–Klein metrics had been used in the 19th century to model non-euclidean geometry. In 1910 Sommerville wrote "Classification of geometries with projective metrics". The classification is described by Daniel Corey as follows:

He classifies them into 9 types of plane geometries, 27 in dimension 3, and more generally 3^{n} in dimension n. A number of these geometries have found applications, for instance in physics.

In 1910 Sommerville reported to the British Association on the need for a bibliography on non-euclidean geometry, noting that the field had no International Association like the Quaternion Association to sponsor it.

In 1911 Sommerville published his compiled bibliography of works on non-euclidean geometry, and it received favorable reviews. In 1970 Chelsea Publishing issued a second edition which referred to collected works then available of some of the cited authors.

Sommerville was elected a Fellow of the Royal Society of Edinburgh in 1911. His proposers were Peter Redford Scott Lang, Robert Alexander Robertson, William Peddie and George Chrystal.

== Family ==
In 1912 he married Louisa Agnes Beveridge.

== Work in New Zealand ==
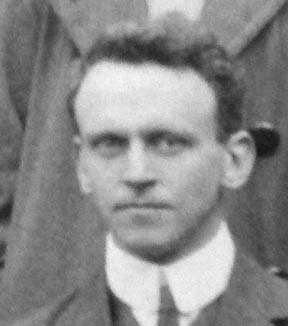
Duncan MacLaren Young Sommerville

In 1915 Sommerville went to New Zealand to take up the Chair of Pure and Applied Mathematics at the Victoria College of Wellington.

He became interested in honeycombs and wrote "Division of space by congruent triangles and tetrahedra" in 1923. The following year he extended results to n-dimensional space.

He also discovered the Dehn–Sommerville equations for the number of faces of convex polytopes.

Sommerville used geometry to describe the voting theory of a preferential ballot. He addressed Nanson's method where n candidates are ordered by voters into a sequence of preferences. Sommerville shows that the outcomes lie in n ! simplexes that cover the surface of an n − 2 dimensional spherical space.

When his Introduction to Geometry of N Dimensions appeared in 1929, it received a positive review from B. C. Wong in the American Mathematical Monthly.

Sommerville was co-founder and first secretary of the New Zealand Astronomical Society (1920). He was President of Section A of the Australasian Association for the Advancement of Science meeting, Adelaide (1924). In 1926 he became a fellow of the Royal Astronomical Society.

He died in New Zealand on 31 January 1934.

== Textbooks ==
- 1914: The Elements of Non-Euclidean Geometry. G. Bell & Sons.
- 1929: An Introduction to the Geometry of N Dimensions, Methuen & Co. (Dover Publications edition, 1958)
- 1933: Analytical Conics. G. Bell and Sons.
- 1934: Analytical Geometry of Three Dimensions. Cambridge University Press.
