= Karim Adiprasito =

German mathematician

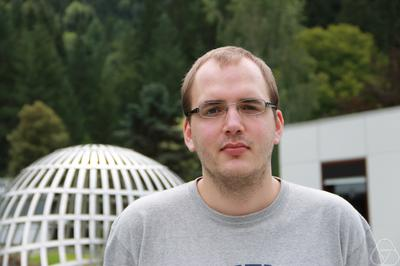
- Karim Adiprasito in Oberwolfach, 2012
- Born: 1988 (age 37–38); Aachen, Germany
- Education: Free University of Berlin
- Scientific career
- Fields: Mathematics
- Workplaces: Sorbonne University
- Doctoral advisor: Günter M. Ziegler

Karim Alexander Adiprasito (born in 1988) is a German mathematician at the Institut de mathématiques de Jussieu – Paris Rive Gauche who works in combinatorics. He completed his PhD in 2013 at Free University Berlin under the supervision of Günter M. Ziegler. He has held positions at the Hebrew University, and the University of Copenhagen. Since 2022, he is a Directeur de Recherche with the CNRS, situated at Sorbonne University.

He was awarded the 2015 European Prize in Combinatorics for his work in discrete geometry, in particular on realization spaces of polytopes citing "his wide-ranging and deep contributions to discrete geometry using analytic methods particularly for his solution of old problems of Perles and Shephard (going back to Legendre and Steinitz) on projectively unique polyhedra."

In joint work with June Huh and Eric Katz, he resolved the Heron–Rota–Welsh conjecture on the log-concavity of the characteristic polynomial of matroids. With Huh, he is one of five winners of the 2019 New Horizons Prize for Early-Career Achievement in Mathematics, associated with the Breakthrough Prize in Mathematics.

Using Mikhail Gromov's work on spaces of bounded curvature, in joint work with Bruno Benedetti he resolved the Hirsch conjecture for flag triangulations of manifolds.

In December 2018, he proved Peter McMullen's g-conjecture for simplicial spheres. For his work, he won the 2020 EMS Prize of the European Mathematical Society.

In 4 August 2025, he was convicted of sexual misconduct by The Hebrew University of Jerusalem's Special Disciplinary Tribunal for the Prevention of Sexual Harassment, following a complaint filed in November 2023. His appeal was rejected in August 2026. Adiprasito accused the university of manipulation of documents and intimidation of witnesses.
