= Francisco Santos Leal =

Spanish mathematician

Francisco "Paco" Santos Leal (born 28 May 1968) is a Spanish mathematician at the University of Cantabria, known for finding a counterexample to the Hirsch conjecture in polyhedral combinatorics. In 2015 he won the Fulkerson Prize for this research.

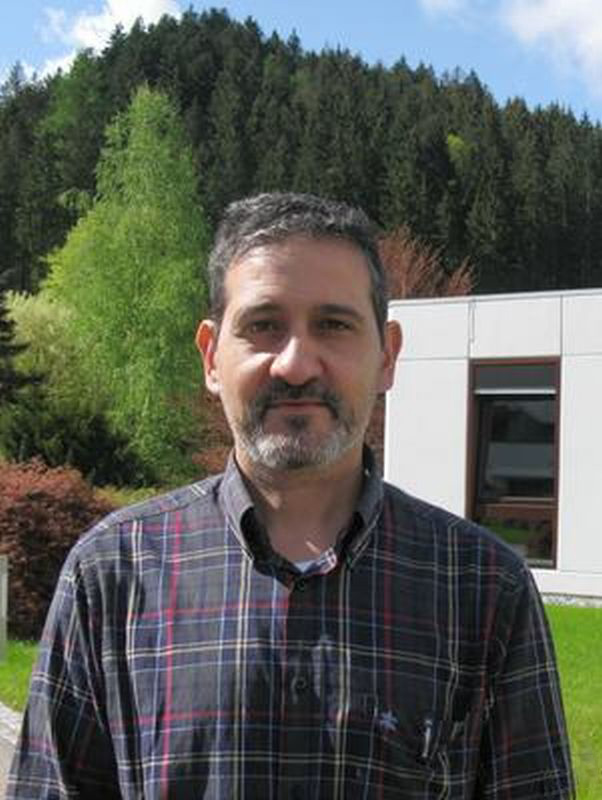
Santos in 2012

Santos was born in Valladolid, Spain. He earned a licenciate in mathematics from the University of Cantabria in 1991, and a master's degree in pure mathematics from Joseph Fourier University in Grenoble, France in the same year. He returned to Cantabria for his doctorate, which he finished in 1995, with a thesis on the combinatorial geometry of algebraic curves and Delaunay triangulations supervised by Tomás Recio. He also has a second licenciate, in physics, from Cantabria in 1996. After postdoctoral studies at the University of Oxford he returned to Cantabria as a faculty member in 1997, and was promoted to full professor in 2008. From 2009 to 2013 he has been vice-dean of the Faculty of Sciences at Cantabria.

As well as being honored by the Fulkerson Prize in 2015 for a counter-example of the Hirsch conjecture, he was an invited sectional speaker at the 2006 International Congress of Mathematicians.

Santos is an Editor-in-Chief of the Electronic Journal of Combinatorics.
