= McMullen problem =

Unsolved problem in mathematics
For how many points is it always possible to projectively transform the points into convex position?
More unsolved problems in mathematics

The McMullen problem is an open problem in discrete geometry named after Peter McMullen.

== Statement ==
In 1972, David G. Larman wrote about the following problem:

Determine the largest number $\nu(d)$ such that for any given $\nu(d)$ points in general position in the $d$-dimensional affine space $\mathbb{R}^d$ there is a projective transformation mapping these points into convex position (so they form the vertices of a convex polytope).

Larman credited the problem to a private communication by Peter McMullen.

== Equivalent formulations ==
=== Gale transform ===
Using the Gale transform, this problem can be reformulated as:

Determine the smallest number $\mu(d)$ such that for every set of $\mu(d)$ points $X=\{x_1,x_2,\dots,x_{\mu(d)}\}$ in linearly general position on the sphere $S^{d-1}$ it is possible to choose a set $Y=\{\varepsilon_1x_1,\varepsilon_2x_2,\dots,\varepsilon_{\mu(d)}x_{\mu(d)}\}$ where $\varepsilon_i=\pm 1$ for $i=1,2,\dots,\mu(d)$, such that every open hemisphere of $S^{d-1}$ contains at least two members of $Y$.

The numbers $\nu$ of the original formulation of the McMullen problem and $\mu$ of the Gale transform formulation are connected by the relationships
$$\begin{align}
\mu(k)&=\min\{w \mid w\leq\nu(w-k-1)\} \\
\nu(d)&=\max\{w \mid w\geq\mu(w-d-1)\}
\end{align}$$

=== Partition into nearly-disjoint hulls ===
Also, by simple geometric observation, it can be reformulated as:

Determine the smallest number $\lambda(d)$ such that for every set $X$ of $\lambda(d)$ points in $\mathbb{R}^d$ there exists a partition of $X$ into two sets $A$ and $B$ with
$$\operatorname{conv}(A\backslash \{x\})\cap \operatorname{conv}(B\backslash \{x\})\not=\varnothing,\forall x\in X. \,$$

The relation between $\mu$ and $\lambda$ is
$$\mu(d+1)=\lambda(d),\qquad  d\geq1 \,$$

=== Projective duality ===
An arrangement of lines dual to the regular pentagon. Every five-line projective arrangement, like this one, has a cell touched by all five lines. However, adding the line at infinity produces a six-line arrangement with six pentagon faces and ten triangle faces; no face is touched by all of the lines. Therefore, the solution to the McMullen problem for d = 2 is ν = 5.

The equivalent projective dual statement to the McMullen problem is to determine the largest number $\nu(d)$ such that every set of $\nu(d)$ hyperplanes in general position in d-dimensional real projective space form an arrangement of hyperplanes in which one of the cells is bounded by all of the hyperplanes.

== Results ==
This problem is still open. However, the bounds of $\nu(d)$ are in the following results:

- David Larman proved in 1972 that
  $$2d+1\leq\nu(d)\leq(d+1)^2.$$
- Michel Las Vergnas proved in 1986 that
  $$\nu(d)\leq\frac{(d+1)(d+2)}{2}.$$
- Jorge Luis Ramírez Alfonsín proved in 2001 that
  $$\nu(d)\leq2d+\left\lceil\frac{d+1}{2}\right\rceil.$$

The conjecture of this problem is that $\nu(d)=2d+1$. This has been proven for $d=2,3,4$.
