= Star product =

Construction in order theory

In mathematics, the star product is a method of combining graded posets with unique minimal and maximal elements, preserving the property that the posets are Eulerian.

== Definition ==
The star product of two graded posets $(P,\le_P)$ and $(Q,\le_Q)$, where $P$ has a unique maximal element $\widehat{1}$ and $Q$ has a unique minimal element $\widehat{0}$, is a poset $P*Q$ on the set $(P\setminus\{\widehat{1}\})\cup(Q\setminus\{\widehat{0}\})$. We define the partial order $\le_{P*Q}$ by $x\le y$ if and only if:

1. $\{x,y\}\subset P$, and $x\le_P y$;
2. $\{x,y\}\subset Q$, and $x\le_Q y$; or
3. $x\in P$ and $y\in Q$.

In other words, we pluck out the top of $P$ and the bottom of $Q$, and require that everything in $P$ be smaller than everything in $Q$.

== Example ==
For example, suppose $P$ and $Q$ are the Boolean algebra on two elements.

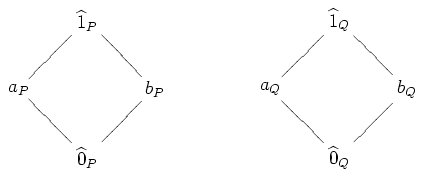

Then $P*Q$ is the poset with the Hasse diagram below.

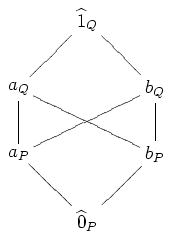

== Properties ==
The star product of Eulerian posets is Eulerian.

== See also ==
- Product order, a different way of combining posets
