= Leah Berman =

American mathematician (born 1976)

Leah Wrenn Berman Williams (born 1976) is a mathematician at the University of Alaska Fairbanks, specializing in discrete geometry. At the University of Alaska, she is a professor of mathematics, the head of the department of mathematics and statistics, and was the interim dean of the College of Natural Science and Mathematics. She was also a member of the borough assembly of Fairbanks North Star Borough, Alaska from 2018 to 2021.

== Research ==
Berman's research involves discrete geometry, and in particular the geometry of configurations of points and lines. Her discoveries in this area have included the construction of the first known movable configurations with four points per line and four lines through each point. With another mathematician at the University of Alaska, Jill Faudree, she has developed methods for constructing highly symmetric configurations with as many as six points per line and six lines through each point.

== Education and career ==
Berman was born in 1976 in St. Louis. She is the daughter of Harry J. Berman, a psychologist and gerontologist at the University of Illinois at Springfield. As a high school student at the Illinois Mathematics and Science Academy, Berman competed in the state Scholastic Bowl Tournament. She chose a double major in mathematics and philosophy at Lewis & Clark College, graduating in 1997 as one of the seven members of that year's graduating class to join the college's Pamplin Society of Fellows.

She completed her Ph.D. in mathematics in 2002 at the University of Washington. Her dissertation, Astral Configurations, was supervised by Branko Grünbaum, as one of Grünbaum's two final doctoral students after he had already retired to become an emeritus professor.

After working as a faculty member in the department of mathematics and computer science at Ursinus College from 2002 to 2009, Berman joined the University of Alaska faculty in 2009.

== Political activities ==
In 2018, Berman was elected to the Fairbanks North Star Borough Assembly for a three-year term. As a member of the assembly, she sponsored successful legislation to rewrite the borough's ordinances using gender-neutral pronouns.
