= Zero-divisor graph =

Graph of zero divisors of a commutative ring

The zero-divisor graph of $\mathbb{Z}_2\times\mathbb{Z}_4$, the only possible zero-divisor graph that is a tree but not a star

In mathematics, and more specifically in combinatorial commutative algebra, a zero-divisor graph is an undirected graph representing the zero divisors of a commutative ring. It has elements of the ring as its vertices, and pairs of elements whose product is zero as its edges.

== Definition ==
There are two variations of the zero-divisor graph commonly used. In the original definition of Beck (1988), the vertices represent all elements of the ring. In a later variant studied by Anderson & Livingston (1999), the vertices represent only the zero divisors of the given ring.

== Examples ==
If $n$ is a semiprime number (the product of two prime numbers) then the zero-divisor graph of the ring of integers modulo $n$ (with only the zero divisors as its vertices) is either a complete graph or a complete bipartite graph. It is a complete graph $K_{p-1}$ in the case that $n=p^2$ for some prime number $p$. In this case the vertices are all the nonzero multiples of $p$, and the product of any two of these numbers is zero modulo $p^2$.

It is a complete bipartite graph $K_{p-1,q-1}$ in the case that $n=pq$ for two distinct prime numbers $p$ and $q$. The two sides of the bipartition are the $p-1$ nonzero multiples of $q$ and the $q-1$ nonzero multiples of $p$, respectively. Two numbers (that are not themselves zero modulo $n$) multiply to zero modulo $n$ if and only if one is a multiple of $p$ and the other is a multiple of $q$, so this graph has an edge between each pair of vertices on opposite sides of the bipartition, and no other edges. More generally, the zero-divisor graph is a complete bipartite graph for any ring that is a product of two integral domains.

The only cycle graphs that can be realized as zero-product graphs (with zero divisors as vertices) are the cycles of length 3 or 4. The only trees that may be realized as zero-divisor graphs are the stars (complete bipartite graphs that are trees) and the five-vertex tree formed as the zero-divisor graph of $\mathbb{Z}_2\times\mathbb{Z}_4$.

== Properties ==
In the version of the graph that includes all elements, 0 is a universal vertex, and the zero divisors can be identified as the vertices that have a neighbor other than 0. Because it has a universal vertex, the graph of all ring elements is always connected and has diameter at most two. The graph of all zero divisors is non-empty for every ring that is not an integral domain. It remains connected, has diameter at most three, and (if it contains a cycle) has girth at most four.

The zero-divisor graph of a ring that is not an integral domain is finite if and only if the ring is finite. More concretely, if the graph has maximum degree $d$, the ring has at most $(d^2-2d+2)^2$ elements. If the ring and the graph are infinite, every edge has an endpoint with infinitely many neighbors.

Beck (1988) conjectured that (like the perfect graphs) zero-divisor graphs always have equal clique number and chromatic number. However, this is not true; a counterexample was discovered by Anderson & Naseer (1993).
