= Gosset graph =

Distance-regular graph with 56 vertices

- Gosset graph (3_{21}) (There are 3 rings of 18 vertices, and two vertices coincide in the center of this projection. Edges also coincide with this projection.)
- Named after: Thorold Gosset
- Vertices: 56
- Edges: 756
- Radius: 3
- Diameter: 3
- Girth: 3
- Automorphisms: 2903040
- Properties: Distance-regular graph Integral; Vertex-transitive; Polytopal

The Gosset graph, named after Thorold Gosset, is a distance-regular graph with 56 vertices and valency 27. It is the 1-skeleton of the 7-dimensional 3_{21} polytope.

== Construction ==
The Gosset graph can be explicitly constructed as follows: the 56 vertices are the vectors in R^{8} obtained by permuting the coordinates and possibly taking the opposite of the vector (3, 3, −1, −1, −1, −1, −1, −1). Two such vectors are adjacent when their inner product is 8, or equivalently when their distance is $4\sqrt 2$.

An alternative construction is based on the 8-vertex complete graph K_{8}. The vertices of the Gosset graph can be identified with two copies of the set of edges of K_{8}. Two vertices of the Gosset graph that come from different copies are adjacent if they correspond to disjoint edges of K_{8}; two vertices that come from the same copy are adjacent if they correspond to edges that share a single vertex.

== Properties ==
In the vector representation of the Gosset graph, two vertices are at distance two when their inner product is −8 and at distance three when their inner product is −24 (which is only possible if the vectors are each other's opposite). In the representation based on the edges of K_{8}, two vertices of the Gosset graph are at distance three if and only if they correspond to different copies of the same edge of K_{8}. The Gosset graph is distance-regular with diameter three.

The induced subgraph of the neighborhood of any vertex in the Gosset graph is isomorphic to the Schläfli graph.

The automorphism group of the Gosset graph is isomorphic to the Coxeter group E_{7} and hence has order 2903040. The Gosset 3_{21} polytope is a semiregular polytope. Therefore, the automorphism group of the Gosset graph, E_{7}, acts transitively upon its vertices, making it a vertex-transitive graph.

The characteristic polynomial of the Gosset graph is

$$(x-27)(x-9)^7(x+1)^{27}(x+3)^{21}. \,$$

Therefore, this graph is an integral graph.
