= Convex position =

In discrete and computational geometry, a set of points in the Euclidean plane or a higher-dimensional Euclidean space is said to be in convex position or convex independent if none of the points can be represented as a convex combination of the others. A finite set of points is in convex position if all of the points are vertices of their convex hull. More generally, a family of convex sets is said to be in convex position if they are pairwise disjoint and none of them is contained in the convex hull of the others.

An assumption of convex position can make certain computational problems easier to solve. For instance, the traveling salesman problem, NP-hard for arbitrary sets of points in the plane, is trivial for points in convex position: the optimal tour is the convex hull. Similarly, the minimum-weight triangulation of planar point sets is NP-hard for arbitrary point sets, but solvable in polynomial time by dynamic programming for points in convex position.

The Erdős–Szekeres theorem guarantees that every set of $n$ points in general position (no three in a line) in two or more dimensions has at least a logarithmic number of points in convex position. If $n$ points are chosen uniformly at random in a unit square, the probability that they are in convex position is
$$\left(\binom{2n-2}{n-1}/n!\right)^2.$$

The McMullen problem asks for the maximum number $\nu(d)$ such that every set of $\nu(d)$ points in general position in a $d$-dimensional projective space has a projective transformation to a set in convex position. Known bounds are $2d+1\le\nu(d)\le 2d+\lceil(d+1)/2\rceil$.
