= N-skeleton =

Concept in algebraic topology

This hypercube graph is the 1-skeleton of the tesseract.

In mathematics, particularly in algebraic topology, the n-skeleton of a topological space X presented as a simplicial complex (resp. CW complex) refers to the subspace X_{n} that is the union of the simplices of X (resp. cells of X) of dimensions m ≤ n. In other words, given an inductive definition of a complex, the n-skeleton is obtained by stopping at the n-th step.

These subspaces increase with n. The 0-skeleton is a discrete space, and the 1-skeleton a topological graph. The skeletons of a space are used in obstruction theory, to construct spectral sequences by means of filtrations, and generally to make inductive arguments. They are particularly important when X has infinite dimension, in the sense that the X_{n} do not become constant as n → ∞.

== In geometry ==
In geometry, a k-skeleton of n-polytope P (functionally represented as skel_{k}(P)) consists of all i-polytope elements of dimension up to k.

For example:

skel_{0}(cube) = 8 vertices
skel_{1}(cube) = 8 vertices, 12 edges
skel_{2}(cube) = 8 vertices, 12 edges, 6 square faces

The 1-skeleton is also known as the vertex-edge graph of the polytope.

== For simplicial sets ==
The above definition of the skeleton of a simplicial complex is a particular case of the notion of skeleton of a simplicial set. Briefly speaking, a simplicial set $K_*$ can be described by a collection of sets $K_i, \ i \geq 0$, together with face and degeneracy maps between them satisfying a number of equations. The idea of the n-skeleton $sk_n(K_*)$ is to first discard the sets $K_i$ with $i > n$ and then to complete the collection of the $K_i$ with $i \leq n$ to the "smallest possible" simplicial set so that the resulting simplicial set contains no non-degenerate simplices in degrees $i > n$.

More precisely, the restriction functor
$$i_*: \Delta^{op} Sets \rightarrow \Delta^{op}_{\leq n} Sets$$
has a left adjoint, denoted $i^*$. (The notations $i^*, i_*$ are comparable with the one of image functors for sheaves.) The n-skeleton of some simplicial set $K_*$ is defined as
$$sk_n(K) := i^* i_* K.$$

=== Coskeleton ===
Moreover, $i_*$ has a right adjoint $i^!$. The n-coskeleton is defined as
$$cosk_n(K) := i^! i_* K.$$
For example, the 0-skeleton of K is the constant simplicial set defined by $K_0$. The 0-coskeleton is given by the Čech nerve
$$\dots \rightarrow K_0 \times K_0 \rightarrow  K_0.$$
(The boundary and degeneracy morphisms are given by various projections and diagonal embeddings, respectively.)

The above constructions work for more general categories (instead of sets) as well, provided that the category has fiber products. The coskeleton is needed to define the concept of hypercovering in homotopical algebra and algebraic geometry.
