= Linear inequality =

Inequality which involves a linear function

In mathematics a linear inequality is an inequality which involves a linear function. A linear inequality contains one of the symbols of inequality:

- < less than
- > greater than
- ≤ less than or equal to
- ≥ greater than or equal to
- ≠ not equal to

A linear inequality looks exactly like a linear equation, with the inequality sign replacing the equality sign.

== Linear inequalities of real numbers ==
=== Two-dimensional linear inequalities ===
Graph of linear inequality: x + 3y < 9

Two-dimensional linear inequalities, are expressions in two variables of the form:

$$ax + by < c \text{ and } ax + by \geq c,$$

where the inequalities may either be strict or not. The solution set of such an inequality can be graphically represented by a half-plane (all the points on one "side" of a fixed line) in the Euclidean plane. The line that determines the half-planes (ax + by = c) is not included in the solution set when the inequality is strict. A simple procedure to determine which half-plane is in the solution set is to calculate the value of ax + by at a point (x_{0}, y_{0}) which is not on the line and observe whether or not the inequality is satisfied.

For example, to draw the solution set of x + 3y < 9, one first draws the line with equation x + 3y = 9 as a dotted line, to indicate that the line is not included in the solution set since the inequality is strict. Then, pick a convenient point not on the line, such as (0,0). Since 0 + 3(0) = 0 < 9, this point is in the solution set, so the half-plane containing this point (the half-plane "below" the line) is the solution set of this linear inequality.

=== Linear inequalities in general dimensions ===
In R^{n} linear inequalities are the expressions that may be written in the form

$f(\bar{x}) < b$ or $f(\bar{x}) \leq b,$

where f is a linear form (also called a linear functional), $\bar{x} = (x_1,x_2,\ldots,x_n)$ and b a constant real number.

More concretely, this may be written out as

$$a_1 x_1 + a_2 x_2 + \cdots + a_n x_n < b$$

or

$$a_1 x_1 + a_2 x_2 + \cdots + a_n x_n \leq b.$$

Here $x_1, x_2,...,x_n$ are called the unknowns, and $a_{1}, a_{2},..., a_{n}$ are called the coefficients.

Alternatively, these may be written as

$g(x) < 0 \,$ or $g(x) \leq 0,$

where g is an affine function.

That is

$$a_0 + a_1 x_1 + a_2 x_2 + \cdots + a_n x_n < 0$$

or

$$a_0 + a_1 x_1 + a_2 x_2 + \cdots + a_n x_n \leq 0.$$

Note that any inequality containing a "greater than" or a "greater than or equal" sign can be rewritten with a "less than" or "less than or equal" sign, so there is no need to define linear inequalities using those signs.

=== Systems of linear inequalities ===
A system of linear inequalities is a set of linear inequalities in the same variables:

$$\begin{alignat}{7}
a_{11} x_1 &&\; + \;&& a_{12} x_2 &&\; + \cdots + \;&& a_{1n} x_n &&\; \leq \;&&& b_1      \\
a_{21} x_1 &&\; + \;&& a_{22} x_2 &&\; + \cdots + \;&& a_{2n} x_n &&\; \leq \;&&& b_2      \\
\vdots\;\;\; &&     && \vdots\;\;\; &&              && \vdots\;\;\; &&     &&& \;\vdots \\
a_{m1} x_1 &&\; + \;&& a_{m2} x_2 &&\; + \cdots + \;&& a_{mn} x_n &&\; \leq \;&&& b_m      \\
\end{alignat}$$

Here $x_1,\ x_2,...,x_n$ are the unknowns, $a_{11},\ a_{12},...,\ a_{mn}$ are the coefficients of the system, and $b_1,\ b_2,...,b_m$ are the constant terms.

This can be concisely written as the matrix inequality

$$Ax \leq b,$$

where A is an m×n matrix of constants, x is an n×1 column vector of variables, b is an m×1 column vector of constants and the inequality relation is understood row-by-row.

In the above systems both strict and non-strict inequalities may be used.

- Not all systems of linear inequalities have solutions.

Variables can be eliminated from systems of linear inequalities using Fourier–Motzkin elimination.

=== Applications ===
==== Polyhedra ====
The set of solutions of a real linear inequality constitutes a half-space of the 'n'-dimensional real space, one of the two defined by the corresponding linear equation.

The set of solutions of a system of linear inequalities corresponds to the intersection of the half-spaces defined by individual inequalities. It is a convex set, since the half-spaces are convex sets, and the intersection of a set of convex sets is also convex. In the non-degenerate cases this convex set is a convex polyhedron (possibly unbounded, e.g., a half-space, a slab between two parallel half-spaces or a polyhedral cone). It may also be empty or a convex polyhedron of lower dimension confined to an affine subspace of the n-dimensional space R^{n}.

==== Linear programming ====
A linear programming problem seeks to optimize (find a maximum or minimum value) a function (called the objective function) subject to a number of constraints on the variables which, in general, are linear inequalities. The list of constraints is a system of linear inequalities.

== Generalization ==
The above definition requires well-defined operations of addition, multiplication and comparison; therefore, the notion of a linear inequality may be extended to ordered rings, and in particular to ordered fields.

== Sources ==
- Angel, Allen R.; Porter, Stuart R. (1989), A Survey of Mathematics with Applications (3rd ed.), Addison-Wesley, ISBN 0-201-13696-1
- Miller, Charles D.; Heeren, Vern E. (1986), Mathematical Ideas (5th ed.), Scott, Foresman, ISBN 0-673-18276-2
