= Stanley–Reisner ring =

Mathematical ring

In mathematics, a Stanley–Reisner ring, or face ring, is a quotient of a polynomial algebra over a field by a square-free monomial ideal. Such ideals are described more geometrically in terms of finite simplicial complexes. The Stanley–Reisner ring construction is a basic tool within algebraic combinatorics and combinatorial commutative algebra. Its properties were investigated by Richard Stanley, Melvin Hochster, and Gerald Reisner in the early 1970s.

== Definition and properties ==
Given an abstract simplicial complex Δ on the vertex set {x_{1},...,x_{n}} and a field k, the corresponding Stanley–Reisner ring, or face ring, denoted k[Δ], is obtained from the polynomial ring k[x_{1},...,x_{n}] by quotienting out the ideal I_{Δ} generated by the square-free monomials corresponding to the non-faces of Δ:

$$I_\Delta=(x_{i_1}\ldots x_{i_r}: \{i_1,\ldots,i_r\}\notin\Delta), \quad k[\Delta]=k[x_1,\ldots,x_n]/I_\Delta.$$

The ideal I_{Δ} is called the Stanley–Reisner ideal or the face ideal of Δ.

=== Properties ===
- The Stanley–Reisner ring k[Δ] is multigraded by Z^{n}, where the degree of the variable x_{i} is the ith standard basis vector e_{i} of Z^{n}.
- As a vector space over k, the Stanley–Reisner ring of Δ admits a direct sum decomposition

$$k[\Delta] = \bigoplus_{\sigma\in\Delta}k[\Delta]_\sigma,$$

whose summands k[Δ]_{σ} have a basis of the monomials (not necessarily square-free) supported on the faces σ of Δ.

- The Krull dimension of k[Δ] is one larger than the dimension of the simplicial complex Δ.
- The multigraded, or fine, Hilbert series of k[Δ] is given by the formula

$$H(k[\Delta]; x_1,\ldots,x_n) =
\sum_{\sigma\in\Delta}\prod_{i\in\sigma}\frac{x_i}{1-x_i}.$$

- The ordinary, or coarse, Hilbert series of k[Δ] is obtained from its multigraded Hilbert series by setting the degree of every variable x_{i} equal to 1:

$$H(k[\Delta]; t,\ldots,t) =
\frac{1}{(1-t)^n}\sum_{i=0}^d f_{i-1} t^i(1-t)^{n-i},$$

where d = dim(Δ) + 1 is the Krull dimension of k[Δ] and f_{i} is the number of i-faces of Δ. If it is written in the form

$$H(k[\Delta]; t,\ldots,t) =
\frac{h_0 + h_1 t + \cdots + h_d t^d}{(1-t)^d}$$

then the coefficients (h_{0}, ..., h_{d}) of the numerator form the h-vector of the simplicial complex Δ.

== Examples ==
It is common to assume that every vertex {x_{i}} is a simplex in Δ. Thus none of the variables belongs to the Stanley–Reisner ideal I_{Δ}.

- Δ is a simplex {x_{1},...,x_{n}}. Then I_{Δ} is the zero ideal and

$$k[\Delta]=k[x_1,\ldots,x_n]$$

is the polynomial algebra in n variables over k.

- The simplicial complex Δ consists of n isolated vertices {x_{1}}, ..., {x_{n}}. Then

$$I_\Delta=\{x_i x_j: 1\leq i < j \leq n\}$$

and the Stanley–Reisner ring is the following truncation of the polynomial ring in n variables over k:

$$k[\Delta] = k\oplus\bigoplus_{1\leq i\leq n} x_i k[x_i].$$

- Generalizing the previous two examples, let Δ be the d-skeleton of the simplex {x_{1},...,x_{n}}, thus it consists of all (d + 1)-element subsets of {x_{1},...,x_{n}}. Then the Stanley–Reisner ring is following truncation of the polynomial ring in n variables over k:

$$k[\Delta] =
k\oplus\bigoplus_{0\leq r\leq d}
\bigoplus_{i_0<\ldots<i_r}x_{i_0}\ldots x_{i_r} k[x_{i_0},\ldots,x_{i_r}].$$

- Suppose that the abstract simplicial complex Δ is a simplicial join of abstract simplicial complexes Δ^{′} on x_{1},...,x_{m} and Δ^{′′} on x_{m+1},...,x_{n}. Then the Stanley–Reisner ring of Δ is the tensor product over k of the Stanley–Reisner rings of Δ^{′} and Δ^{′′}:

$$k[\Delta]\simeq k[\Delta']\otimes_k k[\Delta''].$$

== Cohen–Macaulay condition and the upper bound conjecture ==
The face ring k[Δ] is a multigraded algebra over k all of whose components with respect to the fine grading have dimension at most 1. Consequently, its homology can be studied by combinatorial and geometric methods. An abstract simplicial complex Δ is called Cohen–Macaulay over k if its face ring is a Cohen–Macaulay ring. In his 1974 thesis, Gerald Reisner gave a complete characterization of such complexes. This was soon followed up by more precise homological results about face rings due to Melvin Hochster. Then Richard Stanley found a way to prove the Upper Bound Conjecture for simplicial spheres, which was open at the time, using the face ring construction and Reisner's criterion of Cohen–Macaulayness. Stanley's idea of translating difficult conjectures in algebraic combinatorics into statements from commutative algebra and proving them by means of homological techniques was the origin of the rapidly developing field of combinatorial commutative algebra.

=== Reisner's criterion ===
A simplicial complex Δ is Cohen–Macaulay over k if and only if for all simplices σ ∈ Δ, all reduced simplicial homology groups of the link of σ in Δ with coefficients in k are zero, except the top dimensional one:

$$\tilde{H}_{i}(\operatorname{link}_\Delta(\sigma); k)=0\quad \text{for all} \quad
i<\dim \operatorname{link}_\Delta(\sigma).$$

A result due to Munkres then shows that the Cohen–Macaulayness of Δ over k is a topological property: it depends only on the homeomorphism class of the simplicial complex Δ. Namely, let |Δ| be the geometric realization of Δ. Then the vanishing of the simplicial homology groups in Reisner's criterion is equivalent to the following statement about the reduced and relative singular homology groups of |Δ|:

$$\text{For all } p\in|\Delta|\text{ and for all }
i<\dim |\Delta| = d-1, \quad
\tilde{H}_i(\operatorname |\Delta|; k) =
H_i(\operatorname |\Delta|, \operatorname |\Delta| - p; k) = 0.$$

In particular, if the complex Δ is a simplicial sphere, that is, |Δ| is homeomorphic to a sphere, then it is Cohen–Macaulay over any field. This is a key step in Stanley's proof of the Upper Bound Conjecture. By contrast, there are examples of simplicial complexes whose Cohen–Macaulayness depends on the characteristic of the field k.
