= Peter McMullen =

British mathematician

- Born: 11 May 1942 (age 84)
- Education: Trinity College, Cambridge
- Known for: Upper bound theorem, McMullen problem
- Scientific career
- Fields: Discrete geometry
- Workplaces: Western Washington University (1968–1969); University College London

Peter McMullen (born 11 May 1942) is a British mathematician, a professor emeritus of mathematics at University College London.

== Education and career ==
McMullen earned bachelor's and master's degrees from Trinity College, Cambridge, and studied at the University of Birmingham, where he received his doctorate in 1968. He taught at Western Washington University from 1968 to 1969. In 1978 he earned his Doctor of Science at University College London where he still works as a professor emeritus. In 2006 he was accepted as a corresponding member of the Austrian Academy of Sciences.

== Contributions ==
McMullen is known for his work in polyhedral combinatorics and discrete geometry, and in particular for proving what was then called the upper bound conjecture and now is the upper bound theorem. This result states that cyclic polytopes have the maximum possible number of faces among all polytopes with a given dimension and number of vertices. McMullen also formulated the g-conjecture, later the g-theorem of Louis Billera, Carl W. Lee, and Richard P. Stanley, characterizing the f-vectors of simplicial spheres.

The McMullen problem is an unsolved question in discrete geometry named after McMullen, concerning the number of points in general position for which a projective transformation into convex position can be guaranteed to exist. It was credited to a private communication from McMullen in a 1972 paper by David G. Larman.

He is also known for his 1960s drawing, by hand, of a 2-dimensional representation of the Gosset polytope 4_{21}, the vertices of which form the vectors of the E8 root system.

== Awards and honours ==
McMullen was invited to speak at the 1974 International Congress of Mathematicians in Vancouver; his contribution there had the title Metrical and combinatorial properties of convex polytopes.

He was elected as a foreign member of the Austrian Academy of Sciences in 2006. In 2012 he became an inaugural fellow of the American Mathematical Society.

== Selected publications ==
Research papers

- McMullen, P. (1970), "The maximum numbers of faces of a convex polytope", Mathematika, 17 (2): 179–184, doi:10.1112/s0025579300002850, MR 0283691, S2CID 122025424.
- —— (1975), "Non-linear angle-sum relations for polyhedral cones and polytopes", Mathematical Proceedings of the Cambridge Philosophical Society, 78 (2): 247–261, Bibcode:1975MPCPS..78..247M, doi:10.1017/s0305004100051665, MR 0394436, S2CID 63778391.
- —— (1993), "On simple polytopes", Inventiones Mathematicae, 113 (2): 419–444, Bibcode:1993InMat.113..419M, doi:10.1007/BF01244313, MR 1228132, S2CID 122228607.

Survey articles

- ——; Schneider, Rolf (1983), "Valuations on convex bodies", Convexity and its applications, Basel: Birkhäuser, pp. 170–247, MR 0731112. Updated as "Valuations and dissections" (by McMullen alone) in Handbook of convex geometry (1993), MR 1243000.

Books

- ——; Shephard, Geoffrey C. (1971), Convex Polytopes and the Upper Bound Conjecture, Cambridge University Press.
- ——; Schulte, Egon (2002), Abstract regular polytopes, Encyclopedia of Mathematics and its Applications, vol. 92, Cambridge: Cambridge University Press, doi:10.1017/CBO9780511546686, ISBN 0-521-81496-0, MR 1965665, S2CID 115688843.
