= Branko Grünbaum =

Yugoslav American mathematician (1929-2018)

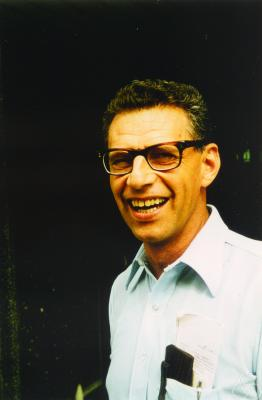
- Branko Grünbaum in 1975
- Born: 2 October 1929; Osijek, Kingdom of Yugoslavia
- Died: 14 September 2018 (aged 88); Seattle, Washington, U.S.
- Education: Hebrew University of Jerusalem
- Awards: Lester R. Ford Award (1976); Carl B. Allendoerfer Award (1978); Leroy P. Steele Prize (2005)
- Scientific career
- Fields: Mathematics
- Workplaces: University of Washington
- Thesis: On Some Properties of Minkowski Spaces (1957)
- Doctoral advisor: Aryeh Dvoretzky
- Doctoral students: Leah Berman; Joram Lindenstrauss; Micha Perles

Branko Grünbaum (Hebrew: ברנקו גרונבאום; 2 October 1929 – 14 September 2018) was a Croatian-born mathematician of Jewish descent and a professor emeritus at the University of Washington in Seattle. He received his Ph.D. in 1957 from the Hebrew University of Jerusalem.

== Life ==
Grünbaum was born in Osijek, then part of the Kingdom of Yugoslavia, on 2 October 1929. His father was Jewish and his mother was Catholic, so during World War II the family survived the Shoah in Croatia by living at his Catholic grandmother's home. After the war, as a high school student, he met Zdenka Bienenstock, a Jew who had lived through the war hidden in a convent while the rest of her family were killed. Grünbaum became a student at the University of Zagreb, but grew disenchanted with the communist ideology of the Socialist Federal Republic of Yugoslavia, applied for emigration to Israel, and traveled with his family and Zdenka to Haifa in 1949.

In Israel, Grünbaum found a job in Tel Aviv, but in 1950 returned to the study of mathematics, at the Hebrew University of Jerusalem. He earned a master's degree in 1954 and in the same year married Zdenka, who continued as a master's student in chemistry. He served a tour of duty as an operations researcher in the Israeli Air Force beginning in 1955, and he and Zdenka had the first of their two sons in 1956. He completed his Ph.D. in 1957; his dissertation concerned convex geometry and was supervised by Aryeh Dvoretzky.

After finishing his military service in 1958, Grünbaum and his family came to the US so that Grünbaum could become a postdoctoral researcher at the Institute for Advanced Study. He then became a visiting researcher at the University of Washington in 1960. He agreed to return to Israel as a lecturer at the Hebrew University, but his plans were disrupted by the Israeli authorities determining that he was not a Jew (because his mother was not Jewish) and annulling his marriage; he and Zdenka remarried in Seattle before their return.

Grünbaum remained affiliated with the Hebrew University until 1966, taking long research visits to the University of Washington and in 1965–1966 to Michigan State University. However, during the Michigan visit, learning of another case similar to their marriage annulment, he and Zdenka decided to stay in the US instead of returning to Israel, where Zdenka was still a doctoral student in chemistry. Grünbaum was given a full professorship at the University of Washington in 1966, and he remained there until retiring in 2001.

== Works ==
Grünbaum authored over 200 papers, mostly in discrete geometry, an area in which he is known for various classification theorems. He wrote on the theory of abstract polyhedra.

His paper on line arrangements may have inspired a paper by N. G. de Bruijn on quasiperiodic tilings (the most famous example of which is the Penrose tiling of the plane). This paper is also cited by the authors of a monograph on hyperplane arrangements as having inspired their research.

Grünbaum's rotationally symmetrical 5-set Venn diagram, 1975

Grünbaum also devised a multi-set generalisation of Venn diagrams. He was an editor and a frequent contributor to Geombinatorics.

Grünbaum's classic monograph Convex Polytopes, first published in 1967, became the main textbook on the subject. His monograph Tilings and patterns, coauthored with G. C. Shephard, helped to rejuvenate interest in this classic field, and has proved popular with nonmathematical audiences, as well as with mathematicians.

In 1976 Grünbaum won a Lester R. Ford Award for his expository article Venn diagrams and independent families of sets. In 2004, Gil Kalai and Victor Klee edited a special issue of Discrete and Computational Geometry in his honor, the "Grünbaum Festschrift". In 2005, Grünbaum was awarded the Leroy P. Steele Prize for Mathematical Exposition from the American Mathematical Society. He was a Guggenheim Fellow, a Fellow of the AAAS and in 2012 he became a fellow of the American Mathematical Society. Grünbaum supervised 19 Ph.D.s and currently has at least 200 mathematical descendants.

== Books ==
- Grünbaum, Branko (2003) [1967], Kaibel, Volker; Klee, Victor; Ziegler, Günter M. (eds.), Convex Polytopes, Graduate Texts in Mathematics, vol. 221 (2nd ed.), Springer-Verlag, ISBN 0-387-00424-6.
- Grünbaum, B. (1972), Arrangements and Spreads, Regional Conference Series in Mathematics, vol. 10, Providence, R.I.: American Mathematical Society, ISBN 0-8218-1659-4.
- Grünbaum, Branko; Shephard, G. C. (1987), Tilings and Patterns, New York: W. H. Freeman, ISBN 0-7167-1193-1.
- Grünbaum, Branko (2009), Configurations of Points and Lines, Graduate Studies in Mathematics, vol. 103, American Mathematical Society, ISBN 978-0-8218-4308-6, MR 2510707.

=== As editor ===
- Davis, Chandler; Grünbaum, B.; Sherk, F. A., eds. (2012) [1981], The Geometric Vein: The Coxeter Festschrift, Springer Science & Business Media, ISBN 978-1-4612-5648-9

== See also ==
- Configuration (geometry)
- Convex uniform honeycomb
- Elongated square gyrobicupola
- Goldner–Harary graph
- Pentagram map
- Simplicial sphere
- Star coloring
- Star polygon
- Grünbaum's theorem
- Grünbaum–Rigby configuration
