= Simple polytope =

N-dimensional polytope with vertices adjacent to N facets

Three-dimensional associahedron. Each vertex has three neighboring edges and faces, so this is a simple polyhedron.

In geometry, a d-dimensional simple polytope is a d-dimensional polytope each of whose vertices are adjacent to exactly d edges (also d facets). The vertex figure of a simple d-polytope is a (d – 1)-simplex.

Simple polytopes are topologically dual to simplicial polytopes. The family of polytopes which are both simple and simplicial are simplices or two-dimensional polygons. A simple polyhedron is a three-dimensional polyhedron whose vertices are adjacent to three edges and three faces. The dual to a simple polyhedron is a simplicial polyhedron, in which all faces are triangles.

== Examples ==
Three-dimensional simple polyhedra include the prisms (including the cube), the regular tetrahedron and dodecahedron, and, among the Archimedean solids, the truncated tetrahedron, truncated cube, truncated octahedron, truncated cuboctahedron, truncated dodecahedron, truncated icosahedron, and truncated icosidodecahedron. They also include the Goldberg polyhedra and fullerenes, including the chamfered tetrahedron, chamfered cube, and chamfered dodecahedron. In general, any polyhedron can be made into a simple one by truncating its vertices of valence four or higher. For instance, truncated trapezohedrons are formed by truncating only the high-degree vertices of a trapezohedron; they are also simple.

Four-dimensional simple polytopes include the regular 120-cell and tesseract. Simple uniform 4-polytope include the truncated 5-cell, truncated tesseract, truncated 24-cell, truncated 120-cell, and duoprisms. All bitruncated, cantitruncated, or omnitruncated four-polytopes are simple.

Simple polytopes in higher dimensions include the d-simplex, hypercube, associahedron, permutohedron, and all omnitruncated polytopes.

== Unique reconstruction ==
Micha Perles conjectured that a simple polytope is completely determined by its 1-skeleton; his conjecture was proven in 1987 by Roswitha Blind and Peter Mani-Levitska. Gil Kalai shortly after provided a simpler proof of this result based on the theory of unique sink orientations.

== See also ==
- Eberhard's theorem, on a sequence of a three-dimensional simple polyhedron's sequence of polygonal faces.
