= Facet (geometry) =

Feature of geometric structures

In geometry, a facet is a feature of a polyhedron, polytope, or related geometric structure, generally of dimension one less than the structure itself. More specifically:

- In three-dimensional geometry, some authors call a facet of a polyhedron any polygon whose corners are vertices of the polyhedron, including polygons that are not faces. To facet a polyhedron is to find and join such facets to form the faces of a new polyhedron; this is the reciprocal process to stellation and may also be applied to higher-dimensional polytopes.
- In polyhedral combinatorics and in the general theory of polytopes, a face that has dimension n − 1 (an (n − 1)-face or hyperface) is called a facet. In this terminology, every facet is a face. A facet of a facet, that is a (n − 2)-face, may be called a ridge.
- A facet of a simplicial complex is a maximal simplex, that is a simplex that is not a face of another simplex of the complex. For (boundary complexes of) simplicial polytopes this coincides with the meaning from polyhedral combinatorics.

For example:

- The facets of a line segment are its 0-faces or vertices.
- The facets of a polygon are its 1-faces or edges.
- The facets of a polyhedron or plane tiling are its 2-faces.
- The facets of a 4D polytope or 3-honeycomb are its 3-faces or cells.
- The facets of a 5D polytope or 4-honeycomb are its 4-faces.
