= Half-space (geometry) =

Bisection of Euclidean space by a hyperplane

In geometry, a half-space is either of the two parts into which a plane divides the three-dimensional Euclidean space. If the space is two-dimensional, then a half-space is called a half-plane (open or closed). A half-space in a one-dimensional space is called a half-line or ray.

More generally, a half-space is either of the two parts into which a hyperplane divides an n-dimensional space. That is, the points that are not incident to the hyperplane are partitioned into two convex sets (i.e., half-spaces), such that any subspace connecting a point in one set to a point in the other must intersect the hyperplane.

A half-space can be either open or closed. An open half-space is either of the two open sets produced by the subtraction of a hyperplane from the affine space. A closed half-space is the union of an open half-space and the hyperplane that defines it.

The open (closed) upper half-space is the half-space of all $x_1, x_2, \dots, x_n$ such that $x_n \ge 0$ ($x_n > 0$). The open (closed) lower half-space is defined similarly, by requiring that $x_n$ be negative (non-positive).

A half-space may be specified by a linear inequality, derived from the linear equation that specifies the defining hyperplane. A strict linear inequality specifies an open half-space:
$$a_1x_1+a_2x_2+\cdots+a_nx_n > b.$$
A non-strict one specifies a closed half-space:
$$a_1x_1+a_2x_2+\cdots+a_nx_n \geq b.$$
Here, one assumes that not all of the real numbers a_{1}, a_{2}, ..., a_{n} are zero.

A half-space is a convex set.

== See also ==
- Hemisphere (geometry)
- Line (geometry)
- Nef polygon, construction of polyhedra using half-spaces
- Poincaré half-plane model
- Quadrant (solid geometry)
- Siegel upper half-space
