= Simplicial sphere =

In geometry and combinatorics, a simplicial (or combinatorial) d-sphere is a simplicial complex homeomorphic to the d-dimensional sphere. Some simplicial spheres arise as the boundaries of convex polytopes, however, in higher dimensions most simplicial spheres cannot be obtained in this way.

One important open problem in the field was the g-conjecture, formulated by Peter McMullen, which asks about possible numbers of faces of different dimensions of a simplicial sphere. In December 2018, the g-conjecture was proven by Karim Adiprasito in the more general context of rational homology spheres.

== Examples ==
- For any n ≥ 3, the simple n-cycle C_{n} is a simplicial circle, i.e. a simplicial sphere of dimension 1. This construction produces all simplicial circles.
- The boundary of a convex polyhedron in R^{3} with triangular faces, such as an octahedron or icosahedron, is a simplicial 2-sphere.
- More generally, the boundary of any (d+1)-dimensional compact (or bounded) simplicial convex polytope in the Euclidean space is a simplicial d-sphere.

== Properties ==
It follows from Euler's formula that any simplicial 2-sphere with n vertices has 3n − 6 edges and 2n − 4 faces. The case of n = 4 is realized by the tetrahedron. By repeatedly performing the barycentric subdivision, it is easy to construct a simplicial sphere for any n ≥ 4. Moreover, Ernst Steinitz gave a characterization of 1-skeleta (or edge graphs) of convex polytopes in R^{3} implying that any simplicial 2-sphere is a boundary of a convex polytope.

Branko Grünbaum constructed an example of a non-polytopal simplicial sphere (that is, a simplicial sphere that is not the boundary of a polytope). Gil Kalai proved that, in fact, "most" simplicial spheres are non-polytopal. The smallest example is of dimension d = 4 and has f_{0} = 8 vertices.

The upper bound theorem gives upper bounds for the numbers f_{i} of i-faces of any simplicial d-sphere with f_{0} = n vertices. This conjecture was proved for simplicial convex polytopes by Peter McMullen in 1970 and by Richard Stanley for general simplicial spheres in 1975.

The g-conjecture, formulated by McMullen in 1970, asks for a complete characterization of f-vectors of simplicial d-spheres. In other words, what are the possible sequences of numbers of faces of each dimension for a simplicial d-sphere? In the case of polytopal spheres, the answer is given by the g-theorem, proved in 1979 by Billera and Lee (existence) and Stanley (necessity). It has been conjectured that the same conditions are necessary for general simplicial spheres. The conjecture was proved by Karim Adiprasito in December 2018.

== See also ==
- Dehn–Sommerville equations
