= Simplicial polytope =

Polytope whose facets are all simplices

Examples of simplicial polytopes

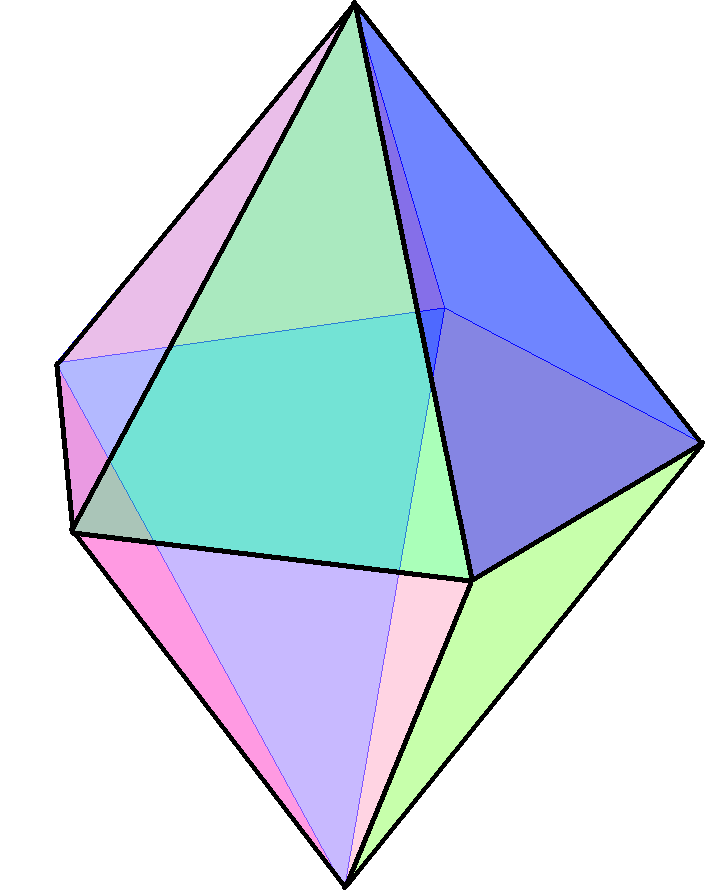
Pentagonal bipyramid, an example of a simplicial 3-tope

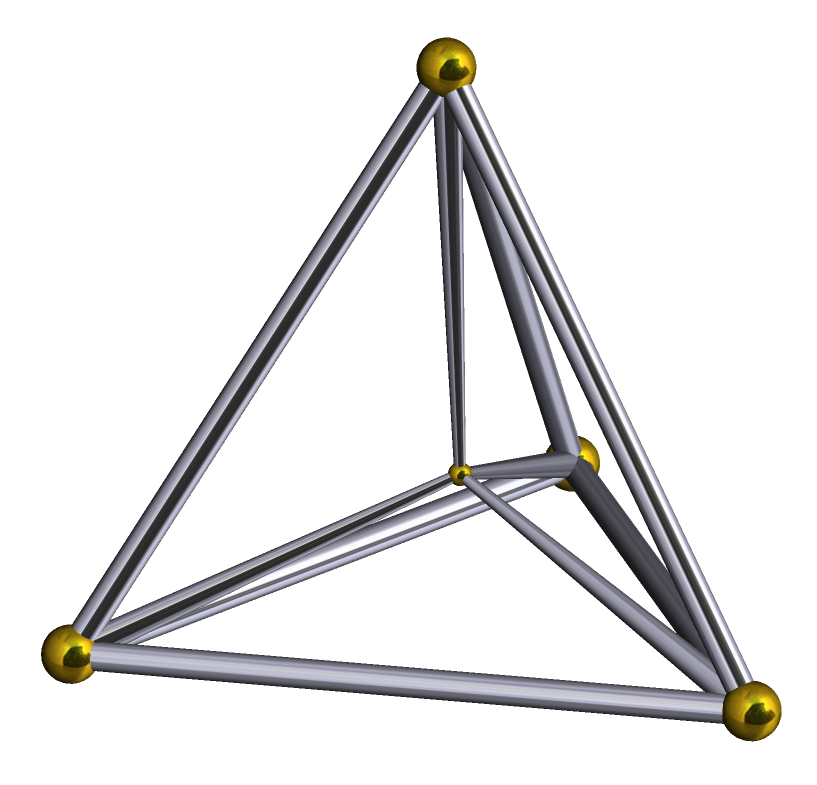
5-cell, an example of 4-tope

Triangular tiling

In geometry, a simplicial polytope is a polytope whose facets are all simplices. It is topologically dual to simple polytopes. Polytopes that are both simple and simplicial are either simplices or two-dimensional polygons.

== Examples ==
In the case of a three-dimensional simplicial polytope, known as the simplicial polyhedron, the polytope contains only triangular faces of any type. These polyhedra include bipyramids, gyroelongated bipyramids, deltahedra (wherein the faces are equilateral triangles, and Kleetope of polyhedra. The simplicial polyhedron corresponds via Steinitz's theorem to a maximal planar graph.

For a simplicial tiling, examples are triangular tiling and Laves tiling.

Simplicial 4-polytopes include:

- convex regular 4-polytope
  - 4-simplex, 16-cell, 600-cell
- Dual convex uniform honeycombs:
  - Disphenoid tetrahedral honeycomb
  - Dual of cantitruncated cubic honeycomb
  - Dual of omnitruncated cubic honeycomb
  - Dual of cantitruncated alternated cubic honeycomb

Simplicial higher polytope families:

- simplex
- cross-polytope (Orthoplex)

== See also ==
- Simplicial complex
- Delaunay triangulation
