= GE B-36 =

GE B-36 may refer to:

- GE B36-7, a four-axle 3,600-3,750 hp (2.7-2.8 MW) B-B diesel-electric locomotive built by GE Transportation Systems between 1980 and 1985.
- GE U36B, a previous four-axle 3,600 hp (2.7 MW) B-B diesel-electric locomotive produced by General Electric from 1969 to 1974.
