= Olga Taussky-Todd =

Austrian and American mathematician (1906–1995)

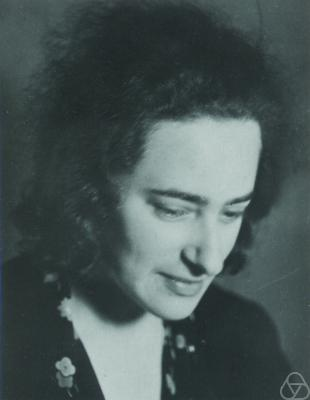
- 1932 in Göttingen
- Born: August 30, 1906; Olomouc, Austria-Hungary
- Died: October 7, 1995 (aged 89); Pasadena, California, U.S.
- Education: University of Vienna
- Known for: Torchbearer for matrix theory; supervised Caltech's first female Ph.D. in Math, Lorraine Foster; corrected David Hilbert's papers
- Spouse: John Todd
- Awards: Fellow of Girton College, Bryn Mawr College, and the AAAS, a Noether Lecturer and a recipient of the Austrian Cross of Honour for Science and Art, 1st class
- Scientific career
- Fields: Mathematics
- Workplaces: National Physical Laboratory; University of London; National Bureau of Standards; California Institute of Technology
- Thesis: Über eine Verschärfung des Hauptidealsatzes (1930)
- Doctoral advisor: Philipp Furtwängler
- Doctoral students: Lorraine Foster; Philip J. Hanlon; Charles Royal Johnson; Hanna Neumann; Robert Charles Thompson; Ed Bender

Olga Taussky-Todd (August 30, 1906 – October 7, 1995) was an Austrian and American mathematician. She published more than 300 research papers on algebraic number theory, integral matrices, and matrices in algebra and analysis.

== Early life ==
Olga Taussky was born into a Jewish family in what is now Olomouc in the Czech Republic, on August 30, 1906. Her father, Julius David Taussky, was an industrial chemist and her mother, Ida Pollach, was a housewife. She was the second of three children. Her father preferred that, if his daughters had careers, they be in the arts, but they all went into the sciences. Ilona, three years older than Olga, became a consulting chemist in the glyceride industry, and Hertha, three years younger than Olga, became a pharmacist and later a clinical chemist at Cornell University Medical College in New York City.

At the age of three, her family moved to Vienna and lived there until the middle of World War I. Later Taussky's father accepted a position as director of a vinegar factory at Linz in Upper Austria. At a young age, Taussky displayed a keen interest in mathematics. After her father died during her last year at school, she worked through the summer at her father's vinegar factory and was pressured by her family to study chemistry in order to take over her father's work. Her elder sister, however, qualified in chemistry and took over her father's work. In "Red Vienna" of the day, the Social Democratic Party of Austria encouraged woman to pursue higher education, and Taussky enrolled at the University of Vienna in the fall of 1925 to study mathematics.

== Career ==
Taussky worked first in algebraic number theory, with a doctorate at the University of Vienna supervised by Philipp Furtwängler, a number theorist from Germany. During that time, she attended meetings of the so-called Vienna Circle, the group of philosophers and logicians developing the philosophy of logical positivism. Taussky, like Olga Hahn-Neurath and Rose Rand, was one of the first women to join the group, which included Otto Neurath, Rudolf Carnap, and Kurt Gödel and which was strongly influenced by Ludwig Wittgenstein.

Taussky is best known for her work in matrix theory (in particular the computational stability of complex matrices), algebraic number theory, group theory, and numerical analysis.

According to Gian-Carlo Rota, as a young mathematician she was hired by a group of German mathematicians to find and correct the many mathematical errors in the works of David Hilbert, so that they could be collected into a volume to be presented to him on his birthday. There was only one paper, on the continuum hypothesis, that she was unable to repair.

In 1935, she moved to England and became a Fellow at Girton College, Cambridge University, as well as at Bryn Mawr College. Soon after, in 1938, she married the Irish mathematician Jack Todd, a colleague at the University of London.

Later, she started to use matrices to analyze vibrations of airplanes during World War II, at the National Physical Laboratory in the United Kingdom. During this time she wrote several articles that were published by the Ministry of Aircraft Production in London. She later described herself as a torchbearer for matrix theory.

In 1945 the Todds emigrated to the United States and worked for the National Bureau of Standards. In 1957 she and her husband both joined the faculty of California Institute of Technology (Caltech) in Pasadena, California. She also supervised Caltech's first female Ph.D. in Math, Lorraine Foster, as well as Hanna Neumann, Philip J. Hanlon, and Charles Royal Johnson.

Taussky retired from teaching in 1977, but continued her correspondence with other mathematicians regarding her work in matrix theory.

== Awards and honors ==
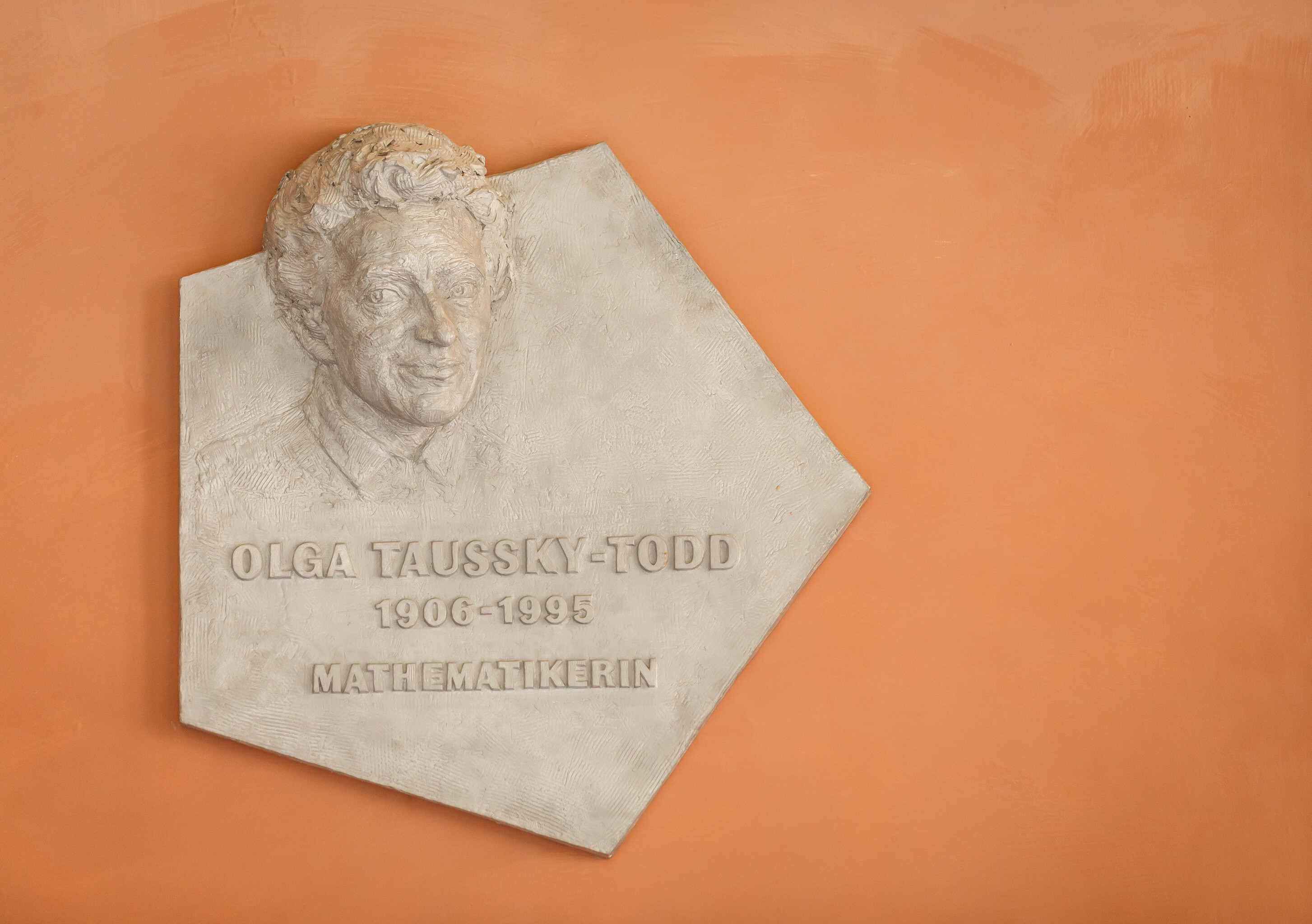
Memorial to Olga Taussky-Todd at the University of Vienna

Taussky received the Ford Prize for an article on sum of squares published in 1970 in American Mathematical Monthly. She went on to receive an honorary doctorate from the University of Vienna and an honorary DSc by the University of Southern California in 1988.

She was a Fellow of the AAAS, a Noether Lecturer and a recipient of the Austrian Cross of Honour for Science and Art, 1st class (1978).

In 1993, the International Linear Algebra Society (ILAS) established a lecture series to honor the contributions to the field of linear algebra made by Taussky-Todd and her husband. In 2021, the Taussky–Todd lecture series was converted to the ILAS Taussky–Todd Prize.

== See also ==
- Latimer–MacDuffee theorem
- Motzkin–Taussky theorem

== Selected publications ==
- Olga Taussky, "How I became a torchbearer for matrix theory," American Mathematical Monthly. v. 95 (1988) JSTOR 2322895
- Olga Taussky, "A recurring theorem on determinants," Amer. Math. Monthly. 56 (1949) 673-676. JSTOR 2305561
- Olga Taussky, "Generalized commutators of matrices and permutations of factors in a product of three matrices," in Studies in Mathematics and Mechanics presented to Richard von Mises, Academic Press, NY, 1954, p. 67.
- Olga Taussky and John Todd, "Infinite powers of matrices," J. London Math. Soc. 17 (1942) 147-151.
- Olga Taussky, "Matrices C with C^{n} → 0," J. Algebra, 1 (1954) 5-10.
- Olga Taussky and John Todd, "Matrices with finite period," Proc. Edinburgh Math. Soc. 6 (1939) 128-134. doi:10.1017/S0013091500024627
- Olga Taussky, "On a theorem of Latimer and MacDuffee," Can. J. Math. 1 (1949) 300-302.
- Olga Taussky, "Sums of squares", American Mathematical Monthly. v. 77, 1970
