= Theodore Motzkin =

Israeli-American mathematician

- תיאודור מוצקין
- Born: March 26, 1908; Berlin, German Empire
- Died: October 15, 1970 (aged 62); Los Angeles
- Education: University of Basel
- Known for: Motzkin transposition theorem Motzkin number PIDs that are not EDs; Linear programming Fourier–Motzkin elimination Weak component Motzkin polynomial
- Scientific career
- Workplaces: UCLA
- Thesis: Beiträge zur Theorie der linearen Ungleichungen (1936)
- Doctoral advisor: Alexander Ostrowski
- Doctoral students: John Selfridge; Rafael Artzy

Theodore Samuel Motzkin (Hebrew: תיאודור מוצקין; 26 March 1908 – 15 December 1970) was an Israeli-American mathematician.

== Biography ==
Motzkin's father Leo Motzkin, a Ukrainian Jew, went to Berlin at the age of thirteen to study mathematics. He pursued university studies in the topic and was accepted as a graduate student by Leopold Kronecker, but left the field to work for the Zionist movement before finishing a dissertation.

Motzkin grew up in Berlin and started studying mathematics at an early age as well, entering university when he was only 15. He received his Ph.D. in 1934 from the University of Basel under the supervision of Alexander Ostrowski for a thesis on the subject of linear programming (Beiträge zur Theorie der linearen Ungleichungen, "Contributions to the Theory of Linear Inequalities", 1936).

In 1935, Motzkin was appointed to the Hebrew University in Jerusalem, contributing to the development of mathematical terminology in Hebrew. In 1936 he was an Invited Speaker at the International Congress of Mathematicians in Oslo. During World War II, he worked as a cryptographer for the British government.

Motzkin married Naomi Orenstein in Jerusalem. They had three sons there.

In 1948, Motzkin moved to the United States. After two years at Harvard and Boston College, he was appointed at UCLA in 1950, becoming a professor in 1960. He worked there until his retirement.

== Contributions to mathematics ==
Motzkin's dissertation contained an important contribution to the nascent theory of linear programming (LP), but its importance was only recognized after an English translation appeared in 1951. He would continue to play an important role in the development of LP while at UCLA. Apart from this, Motzkin published about diverse problems in algebra, graph theory, approximation theory, combinatorics, numerical analysis, algebraic geometry and number theory.

The Motzkin transposition theorem, Motzkin numbers, Motzkin–Taussky theorem and the Fourier–Motzkin elimination are named after him. He first developed the "double description" algorithm of polyhedral combinatorics and computational geometry. He was the first to prove the existence of principal ideal domains that are not Euclidean domains, $\mathbb{Z}\left[\frac{1+\sqrt{-19}}{2}\right]$ being his first example.

He found the first explicit example of a nonnegative polynomial which is not a sum of squares, known as the Motzkin polynomial $X^4Y^2+X^2Y^4-3X^2Y^2+1$, and showed that it was positive using the AM–GM inequality.

The quote "complete disorder is impossible," describing Ramsey theory, is attributed to him.

== See also ==
- Cyclic polytope
- Pentagram map, a related concept
