= Motzkin–Taussky theorem =

Theorem on linear operators

The Motzkin–Taussky theorem is a result from operator and matrix theory about the representation of a sum of two bounded, linear operators (resp. matrices). The theorem was proven by Theodore Motzkin and Olga Taussky-Todd.

The theorem is used in perturbation theory, where e.g. operators of the form

$$T+xT_1$$

are examined.

== Statement ==
Let $X$ be a finite-dimensional complex vector space. Furthermore, let $A,B\in B(X)$ be such that all linear combinations

$$T=\alpha A+\beta B$$

are diagonalizable for all $\alpha,\beta\in \C$. Then all eigenvalues of $T$ are of the form

$$\lambda_{T}=\alpha\lambda_{A} + \beta \lambda_{B}$$

(i.e. they are linear in $\alpha$ and $\beta$) and $\lambda_{A},\lambda_{B}$ are independent of the choice of $\alpha,\beta$.

Here $\lambda_{A}$ stands for an eigenvalue of $A$.

=== Comments ===
- Motzkin and Taussky call the above property of the linearity of the eigenvalues in $\alpha,\beta$ property L.

== Bibliography ==
- Kato, Tosio (1995). Perturbation Theory for Linear Operators. Classics in Mathematics. Vol. 132 (2 ed.). Berlin, Heidelberg: Springer. p. 86. doi:10.1007/978-3-642-66282-9. ISBN 978-3-540-58661-6.
- Friedland, Shmuel (1981). "A generalization of the Motzkin-Taussky theorem". Linear Algebra and Its Applications. 36: 103–109. doi:10.1016/0024-3795(81)90223-8.
