= Slug (railroad) =

Type of rolling stock

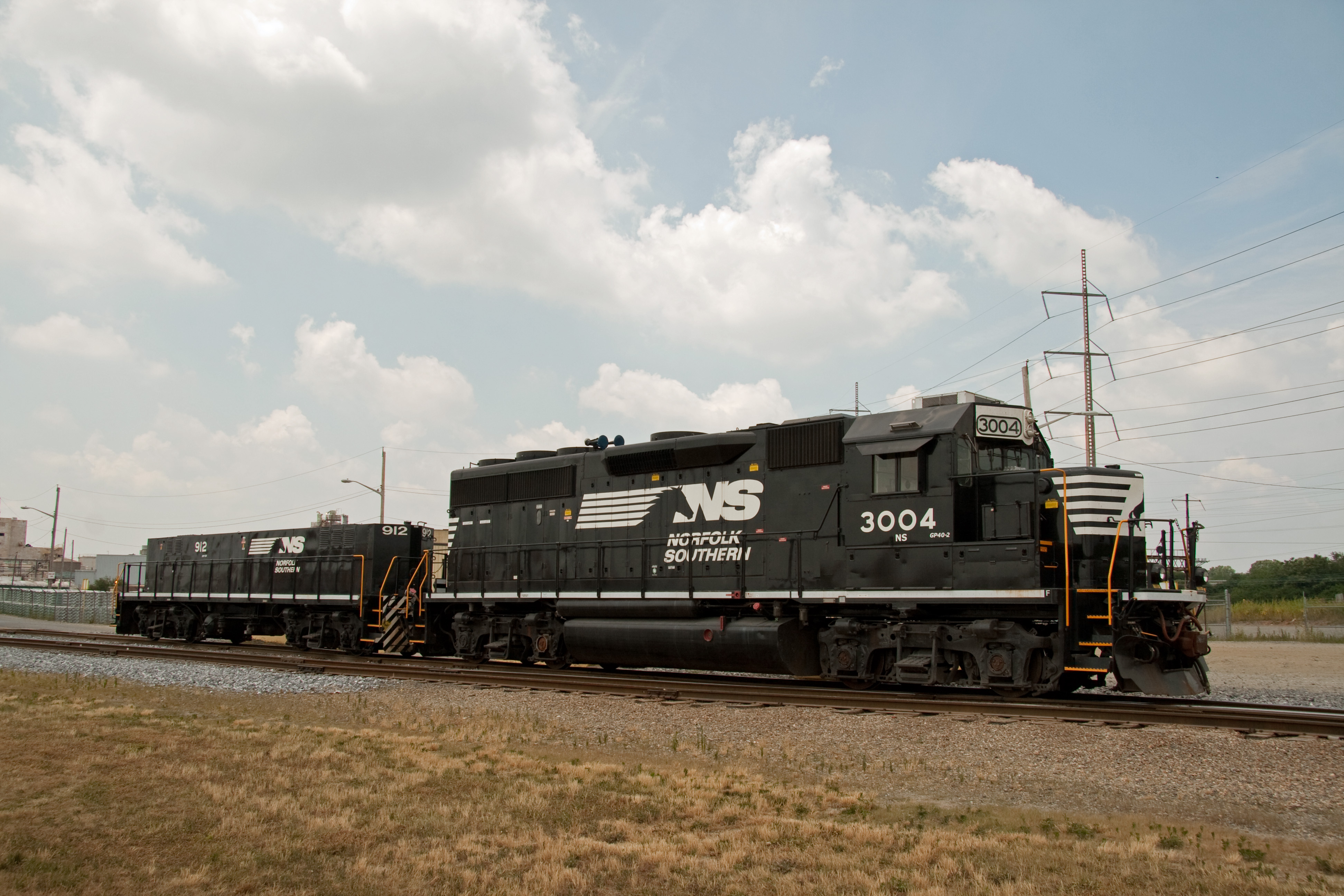
Low-profile slug behind a full-sized diesel–electric. It has no cab or prime mover, though some slugs retain their cabs.

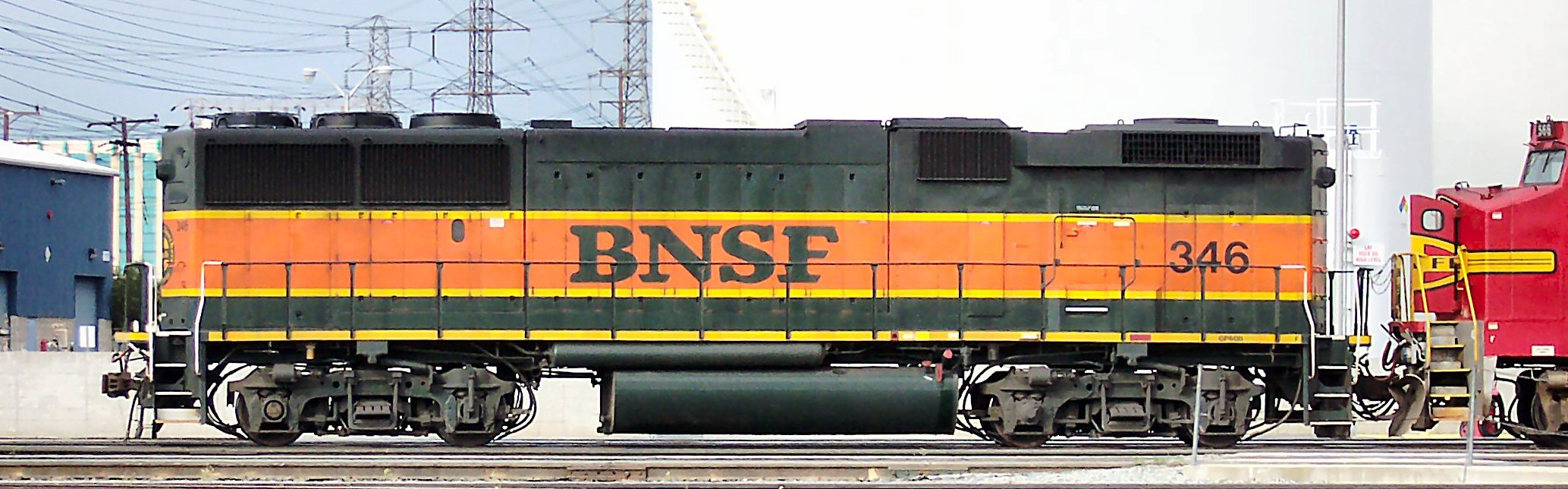
In contrast, a B unit has both a prime mover and traction motors, but never a cab.

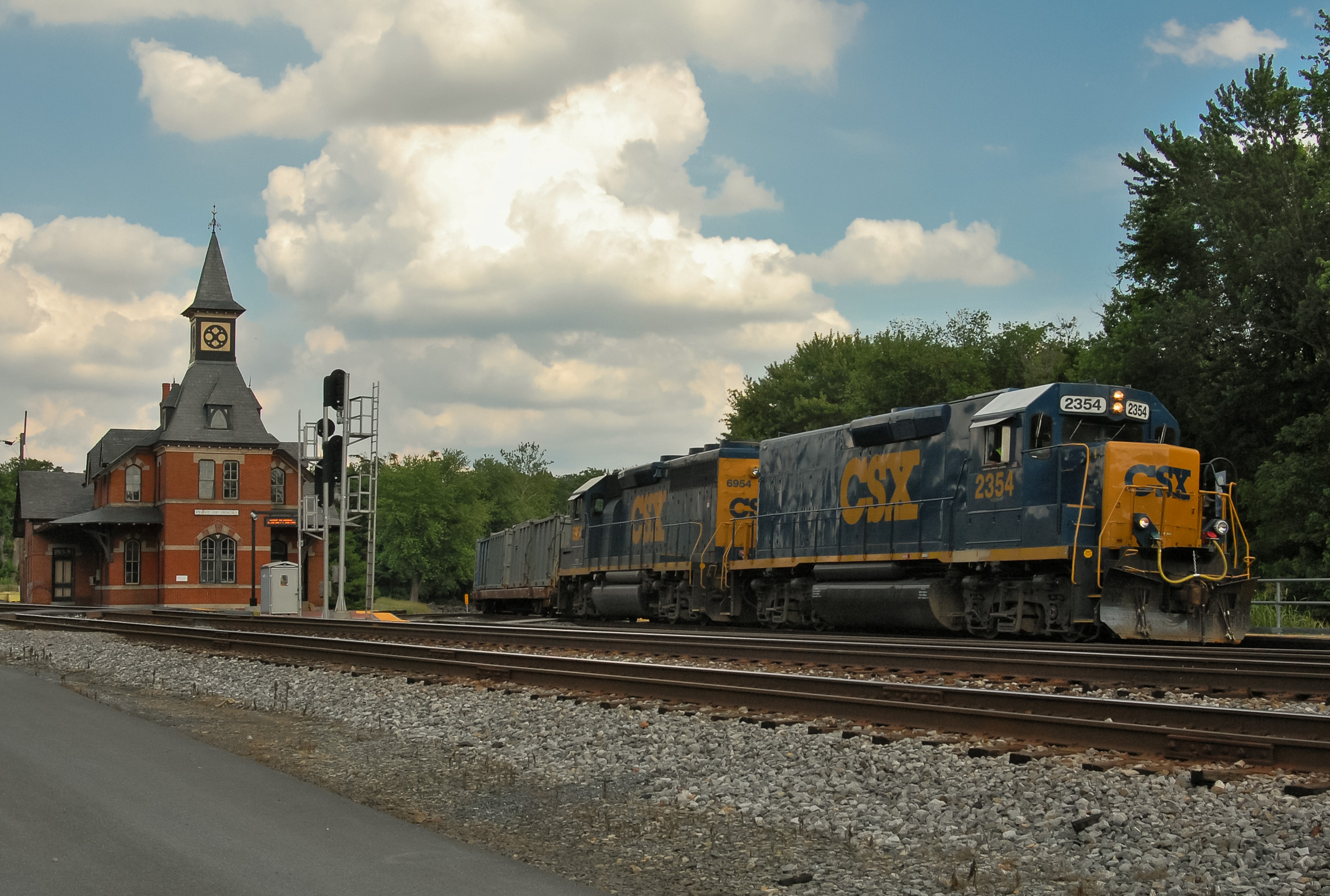
A cabbed slug (CSXT No. 2354) leading its mother

In railroading, a slug is a version of a diesel–electric locomotive which lacks a prime mover and often a cab. It derives the electrical power needed to operate its traction motors and motor controls from a fully-powered mother locomotive. At low speeds the drawing (or braking) force a diesel–electric locomotive can produce is often limited by its traction motors or the grip of its drive wheels on the track, not the capability of its diesel engine(s). A slug adds more traction motors and drive wheels to both use more of the power the mother's engine can produce that cannot otherwise be used at low speeds and provide better braking, without the expense of a full locomotive.

A slug is distinct from a B unit, which has both a prime mover and traction motors but no cab. A slug may have an operator's cab to allow engineers to operate a train with the slug in the lead, or the cab and much of the body can be omitted to reduce cost and size, the latter allowing better visibility for an operator in the mother.

== Basic principles ==
A slug is used to increase adhesive weight, allowing full power to be applied at a lower speed, thus allowing a higher maximum tractive effort. They are often used in low-speed operations such as switching operations in yards. At low speeds, a diesel–electric locomotive prime mover is capable of producing more power than its traction motors can use effectively. Extra power would cause the wheels to slip and possibly overheat the traction motors. A slug increases the number of traction motors and drive wheels available to the locomotive, increasing both the pulling and braking forces. In addition, the load on each traction motor is reduced, helping prevent overheating from excess current. Lacking a prime mover, a slug typically carries ballast to improve traction, often in the form of large blocks of concrete.

Slugs can be built new or converted from existing locomotives. Conversion has enjoyed popularity as a way to reuse otherwise obsolete locomotives, especially those with worn-out diesel prime movers but working traction motors.

== Types ==
There are several types of slug, distinguished by intended use. This division is not absolute, and characteristics of one type may appear in another.

=== Yard slug ===
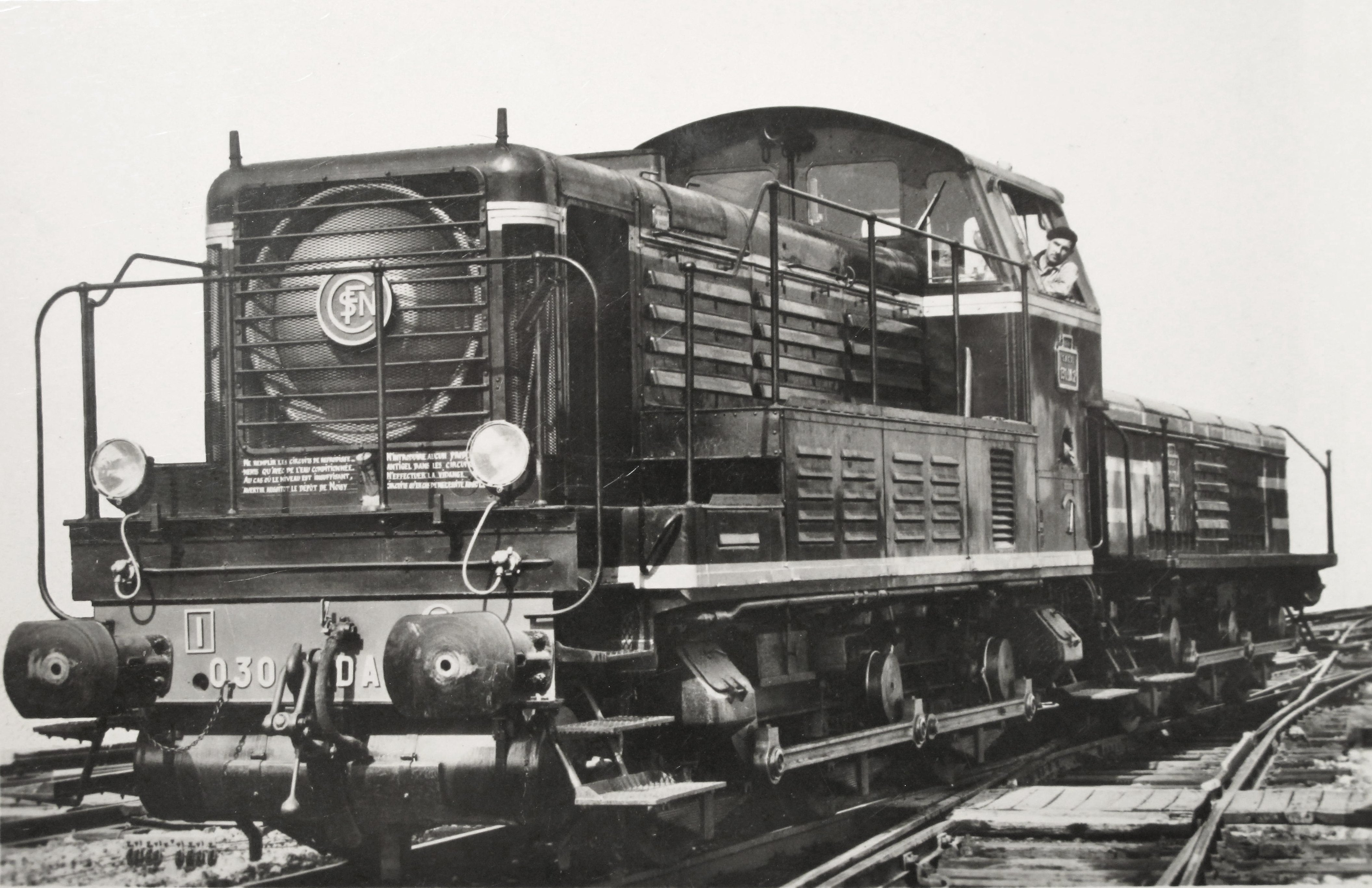
SNCF Class 030 DA (then C 61000) yard locomotive and a TC 61100 yard slug

A yard slug is designed for switching, and therefore is built to favor visibility in low-speed operation. It has a low body, allowing the engineer or driver in the powered unit to see past it. Mother–slug sets are used in heavy switching, hump yard switching, and transfer runs between yards. Some are radio-controlled without an engineer in the cab.

=== Hump slug ===
A hump slug is a slow-speed slug designed for the specialized purpose of pushing a long cut of cars over a hump at just 2 to 3 mph (3 to 5 km/h) instead of up to 15 miles per hour (24 km/h). It often has six axles, and is paired with a lower-powered six-axle locomotive, which produces enough electrical power for both, but insufficient tractive effort on its own.

=== Road slug ===
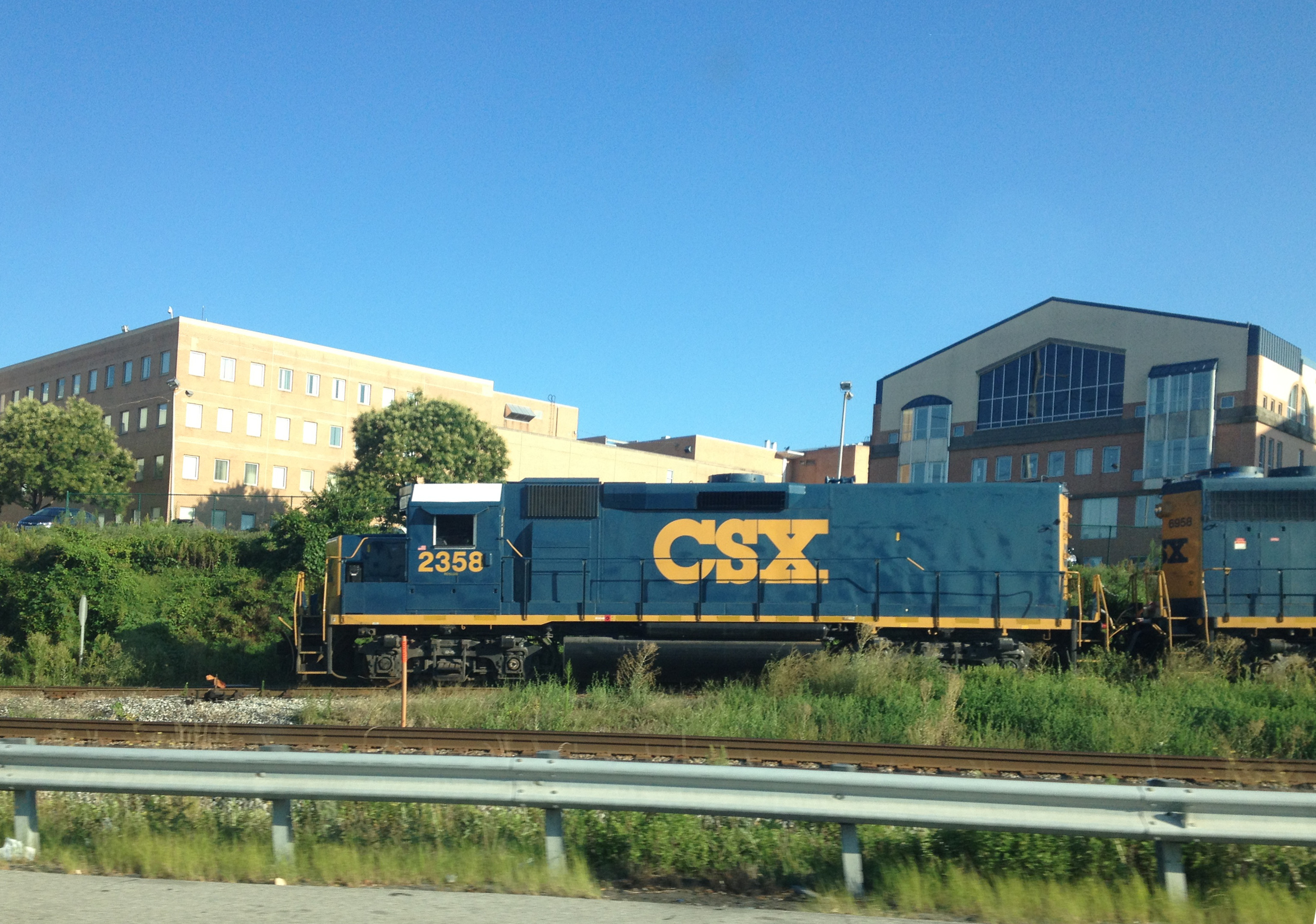
CSX ex-EMD GP40 road slug 2358 in Chester, Pennsylvania. It lacks radiator openings and fans, compared to the trailing unit.

A road slug is designed to serve as part of a regular locomotive consist for road haulage. It usually retains dynamic braking, a feature useless at the low speeds encountered in switching service, and it may be equipped to serve as a fuel tender for an attached mother locomotive.

In operation, it is used to provide extra traction at low speeds. As speed increases it is disconnected from the power circuit and can function as a control cab if in the lead, or simply as an unpowered car in the consist. In braking it augments the powered locomotives during both dynamic and air brake application.

Road slugs may take several forms. A group of GP30, GP35, GP38, GP38AC, and GP40 locomotives were converted by CSX and operated as parts of mother–slug pairs. Externally they retain the general appearance of powered diesel–electric locomotives, though they can be identified by the absence of radiators and most of the access doors on the sides. They retain functional cabs and so can function as leads in strings of units. The TEBU units created on the Southern Pacific Railroad from General Electric U25Bs, and SE units built from F7B units by the Milwaukee Road, on the other hand, were cabless; this potential operational deficiency was compensated for by placing them as the center units of sets of three.

=== Motor for added tractive effort (MATE) ===
Motors for added tractive effort, or MATEs, appear similar to slugs, but their design is different. Instead of siphoning off power as a slug does, the axles in a MATE are fully connected into the transition series in the locomotive it is connected to. A double-ended MATE (a MATE with connections on both ends) turns two four-axle locomotives into the equivalent of two fully fledged six-axle locomotives. A single-ended MATE turns a four-axle locomotive into the equivalent of an eight-axle locomotive.. MATEs do not cut out at speed, as the motors are fully included in the series–parallel transition stages. Seaboard Coast Line Railroad's GE U36B fleet is the prime example: they were delivered new with special electrical cabinets to handle the two-to-four extra motors in a MATE. With a double-ended MATE, two U36Bs were equivalent to two U36Cs in every way.

Some railroads emulated this concept by using two GP40s, then swapping in six-axle Dash 2 electrical cabinets, and then connecting the GP40s to a double-ended slug rebuilt from an old locomotive. The result is the equivalent of two SD40-2s (6,000 hp [4.5 MW] and 12 traction motors), except composed entirely of two-axle bogies. This can be advantageous on repurposed intra-urban lines, where turns may be too tight to permit three-axle bogies.

== Terminology ==
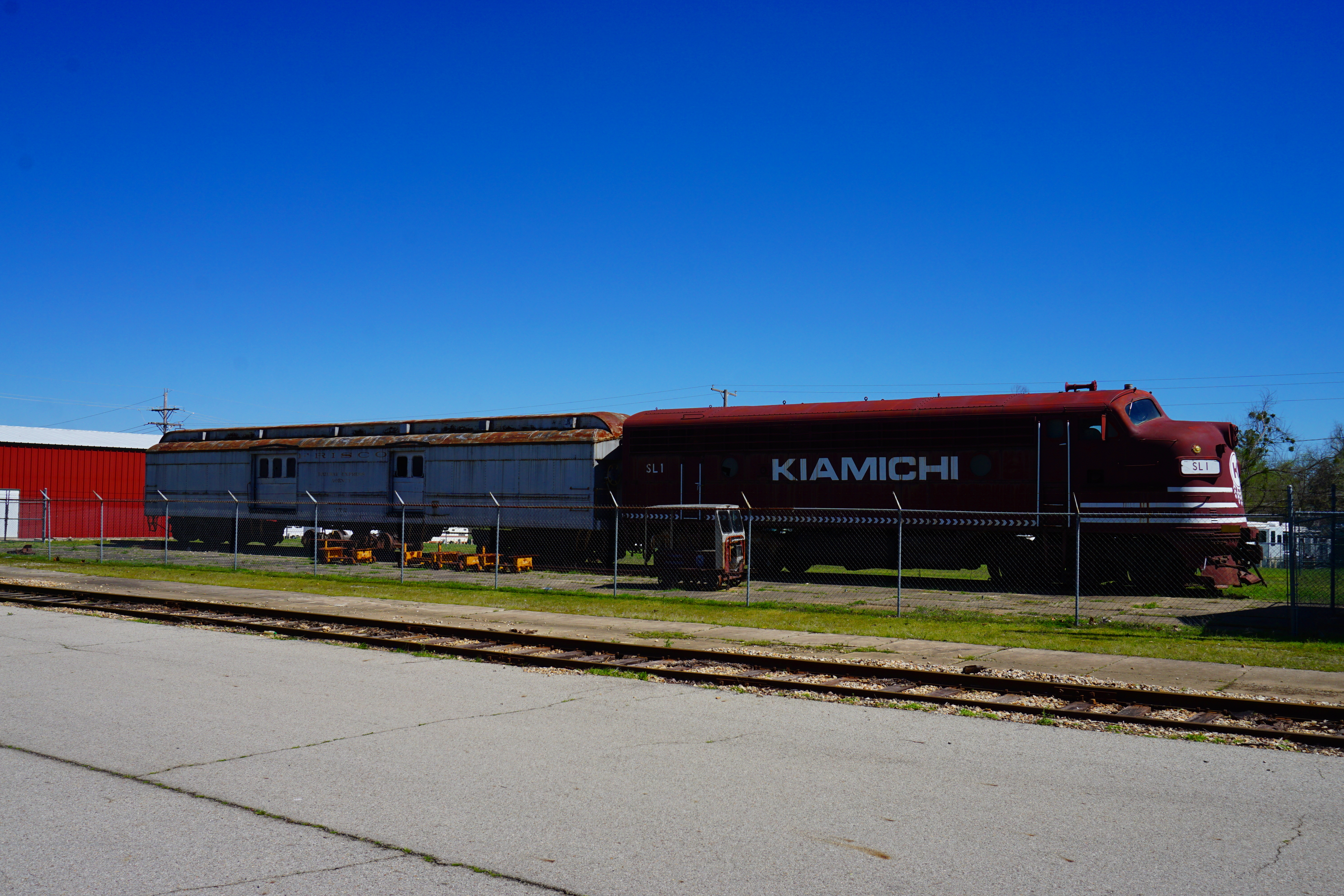
Kiamichi Railroad EMD F7 slug No. SL1 on display outside the Frisco Depot Museum in Hugo, Oklahoma

Slugs are known by other names as well. Some are:

- Drone (used by the Santa Fe)
- MATE (motors for added tractive effort, used by GE)
- RDMT (road MATE), used by CSX
- RDMATE (used by EMD)
- TEBU (tractive effort booster unit, used by Morrison-Knudsen and Southern Pacific)
- TEBC (tractive effort booster cab, used by BN/BNSF cabbed slugs)
- TEBCU (tractive effort booster cab unit, used by BN/BNSF cabbed slugs)
- Hump booster (used by Canadian National)
- Motor Trailer (MT) (used by Conrail)

=== Not slugs ===
Powered slug-like units with no traction motors, a defining trait of a slug:

- B-unit

Powered units with no traction motors or cab:

- CCRCLs (control car remote control locomotives) used by Union Pacific.

== Snails ==
A snail, often confused with a slug, is a cabless locomotive with a prime mover but no traction motors. Like a slug, a snail is incapable of operating under its own power.

Also like slugs, snails are rebuilt from damaged or worn out locomotives and retain the frame and bogies from the original unit. Snails are used for powering engineless units and have no cab or means to control themselves manually, except from a separate unit. SP rebuilt 9 F7Bs into snails for their rotary snowplows. Some of these are still in use today with Union Pacific, along with their snowplow parent units, clearing snow on Donner Pass.

== See also ==
- Cow–calf
- Brake tender
