= Philip J. Hanlon =

Hungarian-American mathematician, computer scientist and educator

Philip Hanlon
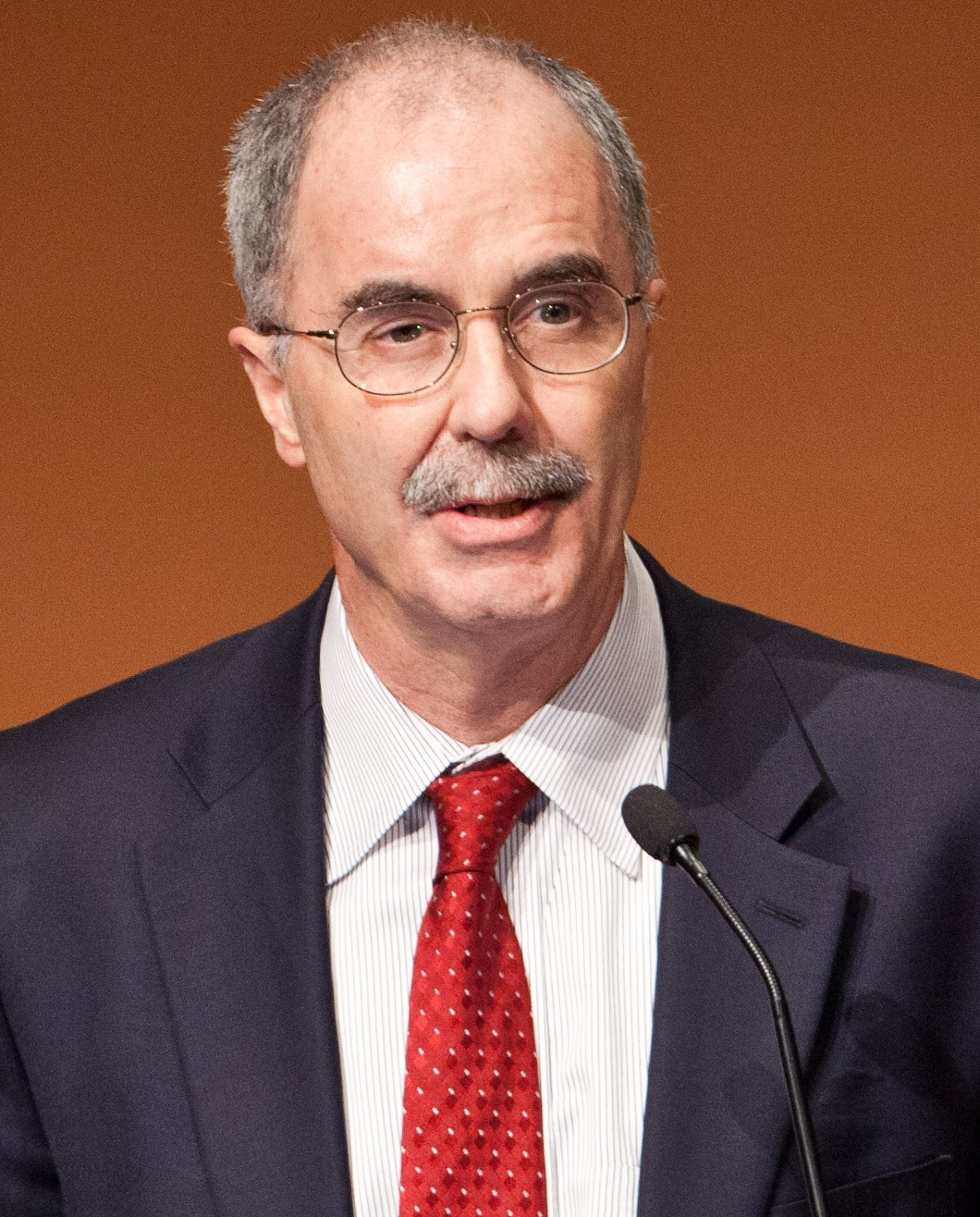
- Hanlon in 2012

18th President of Dartmouth College
- In office June 10, 2013 – June 11, 2023
- Preceded by: Jim Yong Kim
- Succeeded by: Sian Beilock

13th Provost and Executive Vice President for Academic Affairs of the University of Michigan
- In office 2010–2013
- Preceded by: Teresa A. Sullivan
- Succeeded by: Martha E. Pollack

Personal details
- Born: April 10, 1955 (age 71) Gouverneur, New York, U.S.
- Education: Dartmouth College (AB); California Institute of Technology (MA, PhD)
- Scientific career
- Fields: Mathematics
- Workplaces: University of Michigan; Dartmouth College
- Thesis: Applications of the Quaternions to the Study of Imaginary Quadratic Ring Class Groups (1981)
- Doctoral advisor: Olga Taussky-Todd

Philip James Hanlon (born April 10, 1955) is an American mathematician. He served as the 18th president of Dartmouth College from June 2013 to June 2023 and as the 13th provost and executive vice president for academic affairs of the University of Michigan from 2010 to 2013.

== Early life and education ==
Hanlon was born and raised in Gouverneur, New York. He attended Dartmouth College, graduating Phi Beta Kappa with a Bachelor of Arts in 1977. While an undergraduate, he was a member of Alpha Delta, the fraternity that was a partial inspiration for the 1978 film Animal House. He earned a doctorate at the California Institute of Technology in 1981. His doctoral dissertation Applications of the Quaternions to the Study of Imaginary Quadratic Ring Class Groups was supervised by Olga Taussky-Todd.

== Career ==
After completing his postdoctoral work at the Massachusetts Institute of Technology, Hanlon joined the faculty of the University of Michigan in 1986. He moved from associate professor to full professor in 1990. He was the Donald J. Lewis Professor of Mathematics. He was the associate dean for planning and finance for the University of Michigan College of Literature, Science, and the Arts from 2001 to 2004 and the vice provost from 2004 to 2010. In 2010, he was appointed as the provost of the University of Michigan. In June 2013 he became the 18th president of Dartmouth College. On January 25, 2022, Hanlon announced he would be stepping down as president in June 2023. In 2024, Hanlon joined the University of Denver's Board of Trustees.

== See also ==
- Wheelock Succession
