= Roger Horn =

American mathematician

Roger Alan Horn
- Born: January 19, 1942 (age 84)
- Education: Cornell University (BS); Stanford University (PhD)
- Known for: Matrix analysis Bateman-Horn conjecture
- Spouse: Susan Horn
- Scientific career
- Fields: Mathematics
- Workplaces: University of Santa Clara; Johns Hopkins University; University of Maryland, Baltimore County; University of Utah
- Thesis: Infinitely Divisible Matrices, Kernels, and Functions (1967)
- Doctoral advisor: Donald C. Spencer, Charles Loewner

Roger Alan Horn (born January 19, 1942) is an American mathematician specializing in matrix analysis. He was research professor of mathematics at the University of Utah. He is known for formulating the Bateman–Horn conjecture with Paul T. Bateman on the density of prime number values generated by systems of polynomials. His books Matrix Analysis and Topics in Matrix Analysis, co-written with Charles R. Johnson, are standard texts in advanced linear algebra.

== Career ==
Roger Horn graduated from Cornell University with high honors in mathematics in 1963, after which he completed his PhD at Stanford University in 1967. Horn was the founder and chair of the Department of Mathematical Sciences at Johns Hopkins University from 1972 to 1979. As chair, he held a series of short courses for a monograph series published by the Johns Hopkins Press. He invited Gene Golub and Charles Van Loan to write a monograph, which later became the seminal Matrix Computations text book. He later joined the Department of Mathematics at the University of Utah as research professor. In 2007, the journal Linear Algebra and its Applications published a special issue in honor of Roger Horn. He was Editor of The American Mathematical Monthly during 1997–2001.

== Personal life ==
In 1987, Horn submitted testimony to the US Senate Subcommittee on Transportation regarding the 1987 Maryland train collision which killed his 16-year-old daughter Ceres who was returning to Princeton University from the family home in Baltimore for her freshman year fall term final exams.

== Bibliography ==
- Horn, Roger Alan; Johnson, Charles Royal (2018) [1985]. Matrix Analysis (2nd ed.). Cambridge University Press. ISBN 978-0-521-54823-6.
- Horn, Roger Alan; Johnson, Charles Royal (1991). Topics in Matrix Analysis. Cambridge University Press. ISBN 0-521-46713-6.
- Garcia, Stephan Ramon; Horn, Roger Alan (2023) [2017]. Matrix Mathematics: A Second Course in Linear Algebra (2nd ed.). Cambridge University Press. ISBN 978-1-108-83710-1.
