= Rafael Artzy =

Israeli mathematician (1912–2006)

- רפאל ארצי
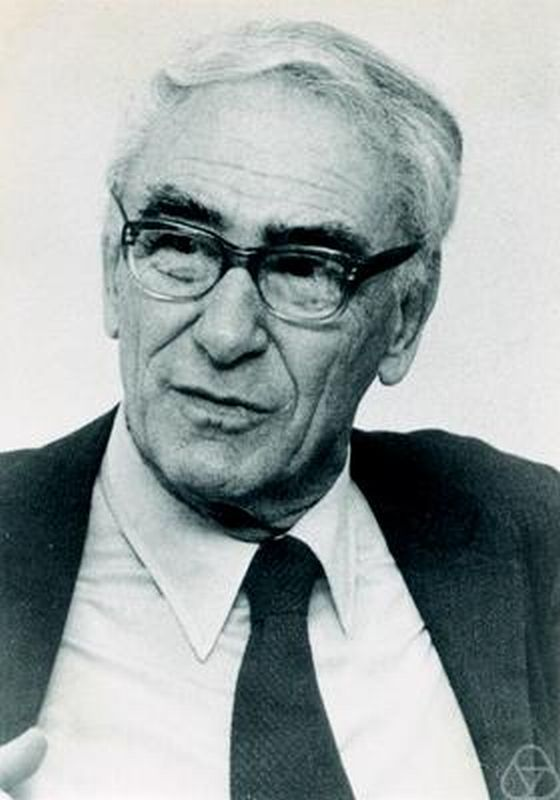
- Artzy in 1980
- Born: 23 July 1912; Königsberg, East Prussia, Germany
- Died: 22 August 2006 (aged 94)
- Citizenship: Israel
- Education: Hebrew University
- Known for: Linear Geometry
- Spouse: Elly Iwiansky
- Children: Ehud, Michal, Barak
- Scientific career
- Fields: Geometry
- Workplaces: University of Wisconsin, Madison; University of North Carolina, Chapel Hill; Rutgers University; Institute for Advanced Study; State University of New York; Temple University
- Doctoral advisor: Theodore Motzkin

Rafael Artzy (Hebrew: רפאל ארצי; 23 July 1912 – 22 August 2006) was an Israeli mathematician specializing in geometry.

== Education and emigration ==
Artzy was born July 23, 1912, in Königsberg, Germany. His father was Edward I. Deutschlander and his mother Ida Freudenheim. Rafael studied at Königsberg University from 1930 to 1933. He transferred to Hebrew University and obtained a master's degree in 1934. He married Elly Iwiansky on October 12, 1934. Rafael continued his studies at Hebrew University under Theodore Motzkin, obtaining a Ph.D. in 1945. Elly and Rafael raised three children: Ehud, Michal, and Barak. Ehud and Barak died before their father. Michal Artzy is emeritus professor in Marine Civilization at the University of Haifa.

Rafael served as both teacher and principal of Israel High School from 1934 to 1951. He was an instructor and assistant professor at the Israel Institute of Technology from 1951 to 1956.

== American tour ==
Rafael Artzy took up a position as research associate and lecturer at University of Wisconsin, Madison in 1956. That year he also made his first of many contributions to Mathematical Reviews. Artzy became associate professor at University of North Carolina, Chapel Hill in 1960. The following year Rutgers University made him a full professor. In 1964 he was a visitor at the Institute for Advanced Study. He wrote Linear Geometry (1965) which was favorably reviewed by H. S. M. Coxeter In 1965 Artzy was at State University of New York in Buffalo. In 1967 he joined Temple University where he was for five years.

== Return ==
In 1972 Rafael Artzy returned to Israel and participated in mathematics at Technion in Haifa. He helped organize a quadrennial conference on geometry at Haifa. For instance, in March 1979 such a conference was held and the proceedings Geometry and Differential Geometry was edited by Artzy and I. Vaisman and published as Lecture Notes in Mathematics #792. In 1992 he published Geometry. An Algebraic Approach Artzy had made 224 contributions to Mathematical Reviews by his last submission in 1995.
