= Charles Royal Johnson =

American mathematician (born 1948)

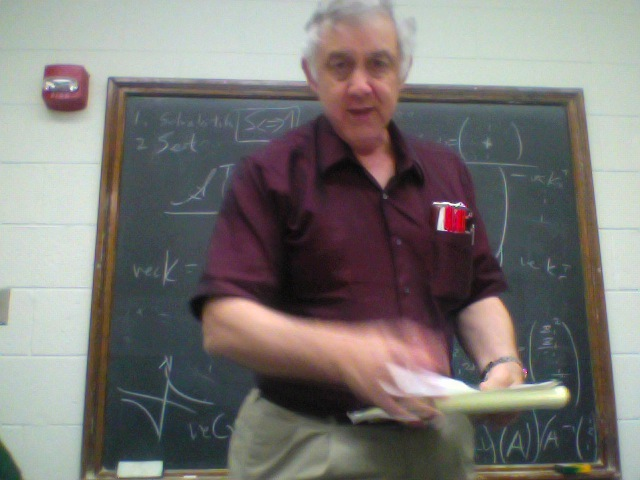
- Born: January 28, 1948 (age 78); Elkhart, Indiana, United States
- Education: Northwestern University, California Institute of Technology
- Scientific career
- Fields: Mathematics
- Workplaces: University of Maryland, College Park; Clemson University; College of William and Mary
- Thesis: Matrices whose hermitian part is positive definite (1972)
- Doctoral advisor: Olga Taussky Todd

Charles Royal Johnson (born January 28, 1948) is an American mathematician specializing in linear algebra. He was a Class of 1961 professor of mathematics at College of William and Mary. The books Matrix Analysis and Topics in Matrix Analysis, co-written by him with Roger Horn, are standard texts in advanced linear algebra.

== Career ==
Johnson received a B.A. with distinction in Mathematics and Economics from Northwestern University in 1969. In 1972, he received a Ph.D. in Mathematics and Economics from the California Institute of Technology, where he was advised by Olga Taussky Todd; his dissertation was entitled "Matrices whose Hermitian Part is Positive Definite". Johnson held various professorships over ten years at the University of Maryland, College Park starting in 1974. He was a professor at Clemson University from 1984 to 1987. He was a professor of mathematics at the College of William and Mary from 1987 to 2024.

== Books ==
- Horn, Roger A.; Johnson, Charles R. (February 23, 1990). Matrix Analysis. Cambridge University Press. ISBN 9780521386326. (1st edition 1985)
  - Matrix Analysis (2nd ed.). Cambridge University Press. October 22, 2012. ISBN 9781139788885. Horn, Roger A.; Johnson, Charles R. (2013). 2nd edition. ISBN 9780521548236; pbk
- Horn, Roger A.; Johnson, Charles R. (June 24, 1994). Topics in Matrix Analysis. Cambridge University Press. ISBN 9780521467131. (1st edition 1991)
- Fallat, Shaun M.; Johnson, Charles R. (April 11, 2011). Totally Nonnegative Matrices. Princeton University Press. ISBN 9781400839018. Fallat, Shaun M.; Johnson, Charles R. (May 2011). cloth cover. ISBN 978-0-691-12157-4.
- Johnson, Charles R.; Saiago, Carlos M. (February 12, 2018). Eigenvalues, Multiplicities and Graphs. Cambridge Tracts in Mathematics, 211. Cambridge University Press. ISBN 9781108547031.
- Johnson, Charles R.; Smith, Ronald L.; Tsatsomeros, Michael J. (October 2020). Matrix Positivity. Cambridge Tracts in Mathematics, 221. Cambridge University Press. ISBN 9781108478717.

=== As editor ===
- Johnson, Charles R., ed. (1990). Matrix Theory and Applications. Proceedings of Symposia in Applied Mathematics, volume 40. American Mathematical Society. ISBN 9780821801543; Lecture notes prepared for the AMS short course "Matrix Theory and Applications" held in Phoenix, Arizona, January 10–11, 1989
