= Fourier–Motzkin elimination =

Mathematical algorithm for eliminating variables from a system of linear inequalities

Fourier–Motzkin elimination, also known as the FME method, is a mathematical algorithm for eliminating variables from a system of linear inequalities. It can output real solutions.

The algorithm is named after Joseph Fourier who proposed the method in 1826 and Theodore Motzkin who re-discovered it in 1936.

== Elimination ==
The elimination of a set of variables, say V, from a system of relations (here linear inequalities) refers to the creation of another system of the same sort, but without the variables in V, such that both systems have the same solutions over the remaining variables.

If all variables are eliminated from a system of linear inequalities, then one obtains a system of constant inequalities. It is then trivial to decide whether the resulting system is true or false. It is true if and only if the original system has solutions. As a consequence, elimination of all variables can be used to detect whether a system of inequalities has solutions or not.

Consider a system $S$ of $n$ inequalities with $r$ variables $x_1$ to $x_r$, with $x_r$ the variable to be eliminated. Let $x' = (x_1, \dots, x_{r-1})$ denote the vector consisting of all variables but $x_r$. The linear inequalities in the system can be grouped into three classes depending on the sign (positive, negative or null) of the coefficient for $x_r$.

- those inequalities that are of the form $x_r \geq b_i-\sum_{k=1}^{r-1} a_{ik} x_k$; denote these by $x_r \geq A_i(x')$, for $i = 1, \ldots, n_A$, where $n_A$ is the number of such inequalities;
- those inequalities that are of the form $x_r \leq b_j-\sum_{k=1}^{r-1} a_{jk} x_k$; denote these by $x_r \leq B_j(x')$, for $j = 1, \ldots, n_B$, where $n_B$ is the number of such inequalities;
- those inequalities in which $x_r$ plays no role, grouped into a single conjunction $\phi$.

The original system is thus equivalent to

$$\max_{i=1}^{n_A}(A_i(x')) \leq x_r \leq \min_{j=1}^{n_B}(B_j(x')) \wedge \phi$$.

Elimination consists in producing a system equivalent to $\exists x_r~S$. Obviously, this formula is equivalent to

$$\max_{i=1}^{n_A}(A_i(x'))
\leq
\min_{j=1}^{n_B}(B_j(x')) \wedge \phi$$.

The inequality

$$\max_{i=1}^{n_A}(A_i(x'))
\leq \min_{j=1}^{n_B}(B_j(x'))$$.

is equivalent to the $n_A \cdot n_B$ inequalities $A_i(x') \leq B_j(x')$, for $1 \leq i \leq n_A$ and $1 \leq j \leq n_B$.

We have therefore transformed the original system into another system where $x_r$ is eliminated. Note that the output system has $(n-n_A-n_B)+n_A \cdot n_B$ inequalities. In particular, if $n_A = n_B = n/2$, then the number of output inequalities is $n^2/4$.

== Example ==
Consider the following system of inequalities:

$$\begin{cases}
2x - 5y + 4z \leqslant 10 \\
3x - 6y + 3z \leqslant 9 \\
-x + 5y - 2z \leqslant -7 \\
-3x + 2y + 6z \leqslant 12 \\
\end{cases}$$

Since all the inequalities are in the same form (all less-than or all greater-than), we can examine the coefficient signs for each variable. Eliminating x would yield 2*2 = 4 inequalities on the remaining variables, and so would eliminating y. Eliminating z would yield only 3*1 = 3 inequalities so we use that instead.

$$\begin{cases}
z \leqslant \frac{10 - 2x + 5y}{4} \\
z \leqslant \frac{9 - 3x + 6y}{3} \\
\frac{7 - x + 5y}{2} \leqslant z \\
z \leqslant \frac{12 + 3x - 2y}{6} \\
\end{cases}$$

which gives the 3 inequalities:

$$\begin{cases}
\frac{7 - x + 5y}{2} \leqslant \frac{10 - 2x + 5y}{4} \\
\frac{7 - x + 5y}{2} \leqslant \frac{9 - 3x + 6y}{3} \\
\frac{7 - x + 5y}{2} \leqslant \frac{12 + 3x - 2y}{6} \\
\end{cases}$$

Simplifying:

$$\begin{cases}
5y \leqslant -4 \\
x + y \leqslant -1 \\
-6x + 17y \leqslant -9 \\
\end{cases}$$

This system uses only 2 variables instead of 3. Examining the coefficient signs for each variable yields all-positive for y, so we can immediately say that the system is unbounded in y: since all y coefficients are positive and all inequalities are less-than-or-equal, setting y to negative infinity (or any sufficiently large negative number) would satisfy the reduced system, therefore there exist corresponding x and z for the larger systems as well, and there are infinitely many such solutions. E.g. setting y = −1000000, x = 0, z = −2222222 satisfies the original system as well as the reduced ones.

== Complexity ==
Running an elimination step over $n$ inequalities can result in at most $n^2/4$ inequalities in the output, thus naively running $d$ successive steps can result in at most $4(n/4)^{2^d}$, a double exponential complexity. This is due to the algorithm producing many redundant constraints implied by other constraints.

McMullen's upper bound theorem states that the number of non-redundant constraints grows as a single exponential. A single exponential implementation of Fourier–Motzkin elimination and complexity estimates are given in.

Linear programming is well known to give solutions to inequality systems in polynomial time, favoring it over Fourier–Motzkin elimination.

== Imbert's acceleration theorems ==
Two "acceleration" theorems due to Imbert permit the elimination of redundant inequalities based solely on syntactic properties of the formula derivation tree, thus curtailing the need to solve linear programs or compute matrix ranks.

Define the history $H_i$ of an inequality $i$ as the set of indexes of inequalities from the initial system $S$ used to produce $i$. Thus, $H_i=\{i\}$ for inequalities $i \in S$ of the initial system. When adding a new inequality $k: A_i(x') \leq B_j(x')$ (by eliminating $x_r$), the new history $H_k$ is constructed as $H_k = H_i \cup H_j$.

Suppose that the variables $O_k = \{x_{r}, \ldots, x_{r - k + 1}\}$ have been officially eliminated. Each inequality $i$ partitions the set $O_k$ into $E_i \cup I_i \cup R_i$:

- $E_i$, the set of effectively eliminated variables, i.e. on purpose. A variable $x_j$ is in the set as soon as at least one inequality in the history $H_i$ of $i$ results from the elimination of $x_j$.
- $I_i$, the set of implicitly eliminated variables, i.e. by accident. A variable is implicitly eliminated when it appears in at least one inequality of $H_i$, but appears neither in inequality $i$ nor in $E_i$
- $R_i$, all remaining variables.

A non-redundant inequality has the property that its history is minimal.

Theorem (Imbert's first acceleration theorem). If the history $H_i$ of an inequality $i$ is minimal, then $1 + |E_i| \ \leq \ |H_i| \ \leq 1 + \left| E_i \cup (I_i \cap O_k)\right|$.

An inequality that does not satisfy these bounds is necessarily redundant, and can be removed from the system without changing its solution set.

The second acceleration theorem detects minimal history sets:

Theorem (Imbert's second acceleration theorem). If the inequality $i$ is such that $1 + |E_i| = |H_i|$, then $H_i$ is minimal.

This theorem provides a quick detection criterion and is used in practice to avoid more costly checks, such as those based on matrix ranks. See the reference for implementation details.

== See also ==
- Farkas' lemma – can be proved using FM elimination.
- Real closed field – the cylindrical algebraic decomposition algorithm performs quantifier elimination over polynomial inequalities, not just linear.
- Gaussian elimination - a similar method, but for equations rather than inequalities.
