= Susan Horn =

American biostatistician

- Born: Susan Helen Dadakis
- Education: Cornell University (BA); Stanford University (PhD)
- Known for: Biostatistics
- Spouse: Roger Horn
- Scientific career
- Fields: Biostatistics
- Workplaces: Johns Hopkins University; University of Utah
- Thesis: The Optimality Criterion for Compound Decision Problems (1968)
- Doctoral advisor: Milton Vernon Johns, Jr.

Susan Helen Dadakis Horn is an American biostatistician. She is the senior scientist at the Institute for Clinical Outcomes Research, a professor at the University of Utah School of Medicine in the Health Services Innovation and Research Program, and an affiliate faculty member at Weill Cornell Graduate School of Medical Sciences. She is known for her work in developing computational statistical models for clinicians to use in-practice to improve therapy results.

== Career ==
Susan D. Horn graduated from Cornell University in 1964 with a Bachelor of Arts in mathematics, after which she completed her Ph.D. in statistics from Stanford University in 1968. From 1968 to 1992, she was a professor at Johns Hopkins University where she conducted research, taught mathematics and health services courses, and directed the Robert Wood Johnson Foundation Program for Faculty Fellowships in Health Care Finance.

== Awards and honors ==
She became a Fellow of the American Statistical Association in 1978.

== Personal life ==
Susan D. Horn is married to Roger Horn, an American mathematician and fellow professor at the University of Utah. They have three children. Their 16-year-old daughter Ceres was killed in the 1987 Maryland train collision while returning to Princeton University from the family home in Baltimore for her freshman year fall term final exams. Roger submitted a testimony on the crash to the US Senate Subcommittee on Transportation.
