= GE B36-7 =

4-axle diesel-electric locomotive

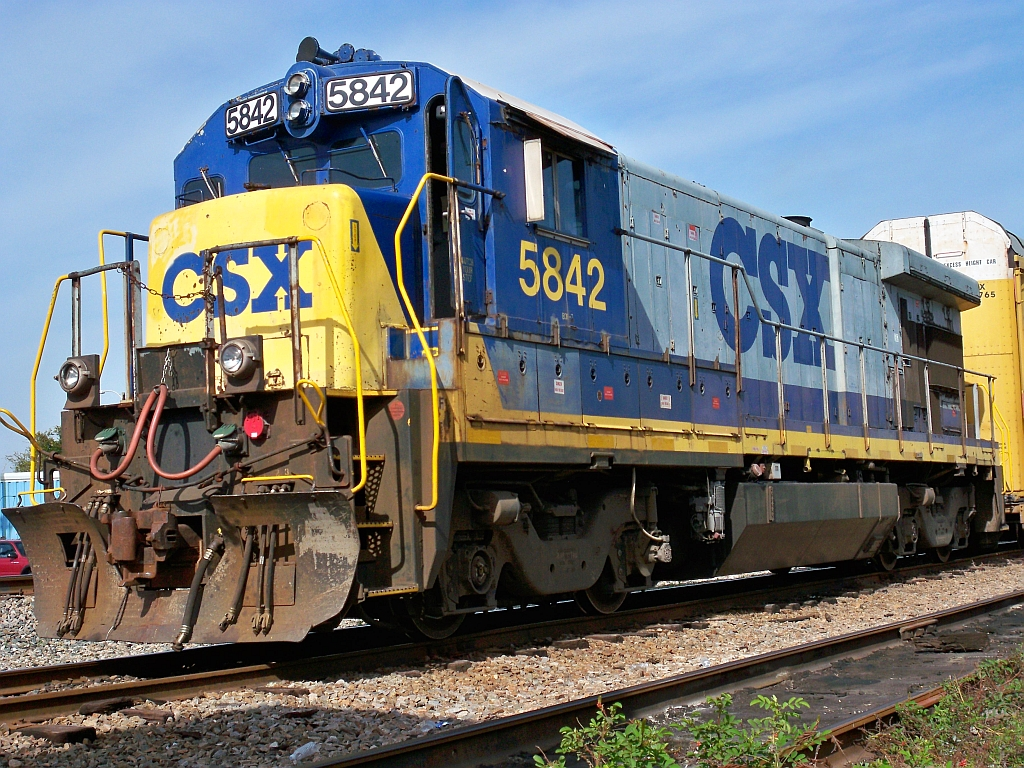
- CSXT 5842, a GE B36-7
Type and origin
- Power type: Diesel-electric
- Builder: GE Transportation Systems
- Model: B36-7
- Build date: 1980 – 1985
- Total produced: 230
Specifications
- Configuration
  - AAR: B-B
- Gauge: 4 ft 8 1/2 in (1,435 mm) standard gauge
- Prime mover: GE 7FDL16
- Aspiration: Turbocharged
Performance figures
- Power output: early: 3,600 hp (2,700 kW) late: 3,750 hp (2,800 kW)
Career
- Locale: North America South America
- Disposition: Most scrapped. Several in service on short lines.

The GE B36-7 is a 4-axle diesel-electric locomotive built by GE Transportation Systems between January 1980 and September 1985. 222 examples of this locomotive were built for North American railroads and eight units were built for a Colombian coal mining operation. The units were designed as successors to GE's U36B's. Of the 230 locomotives built, 180 of them were built for two Eastern railroads - Seaboard System Railroad (which became part of CSX Transportation in 1986) and Conrail.

These 4-axle locomotives were powerful when introduced in 1980. When first built the units were rated at 3,600 hp (2,700 kW), later versions were rated at 3,750 hp (2,800 kW). They were designed for fast and priority service, moving intermodal and container trains.

== Design ==
The B36-7 was developed from the B30-7, and externally is identical to its predecessor. The first 4 B36-7s were built for the Cotton Belt in January 1980, as modified B30-7s with increased horsepower and several new design features: according to Extra 2200 South magazine these units featured General Electric's new Sentry Adhesion System, a wheel slip detection system. These 3600 horsepower units also featured the new GE 752AF traction motor, the new GTA-24 traction alternator and 83:20 fine tooth gearing.

== Production ==
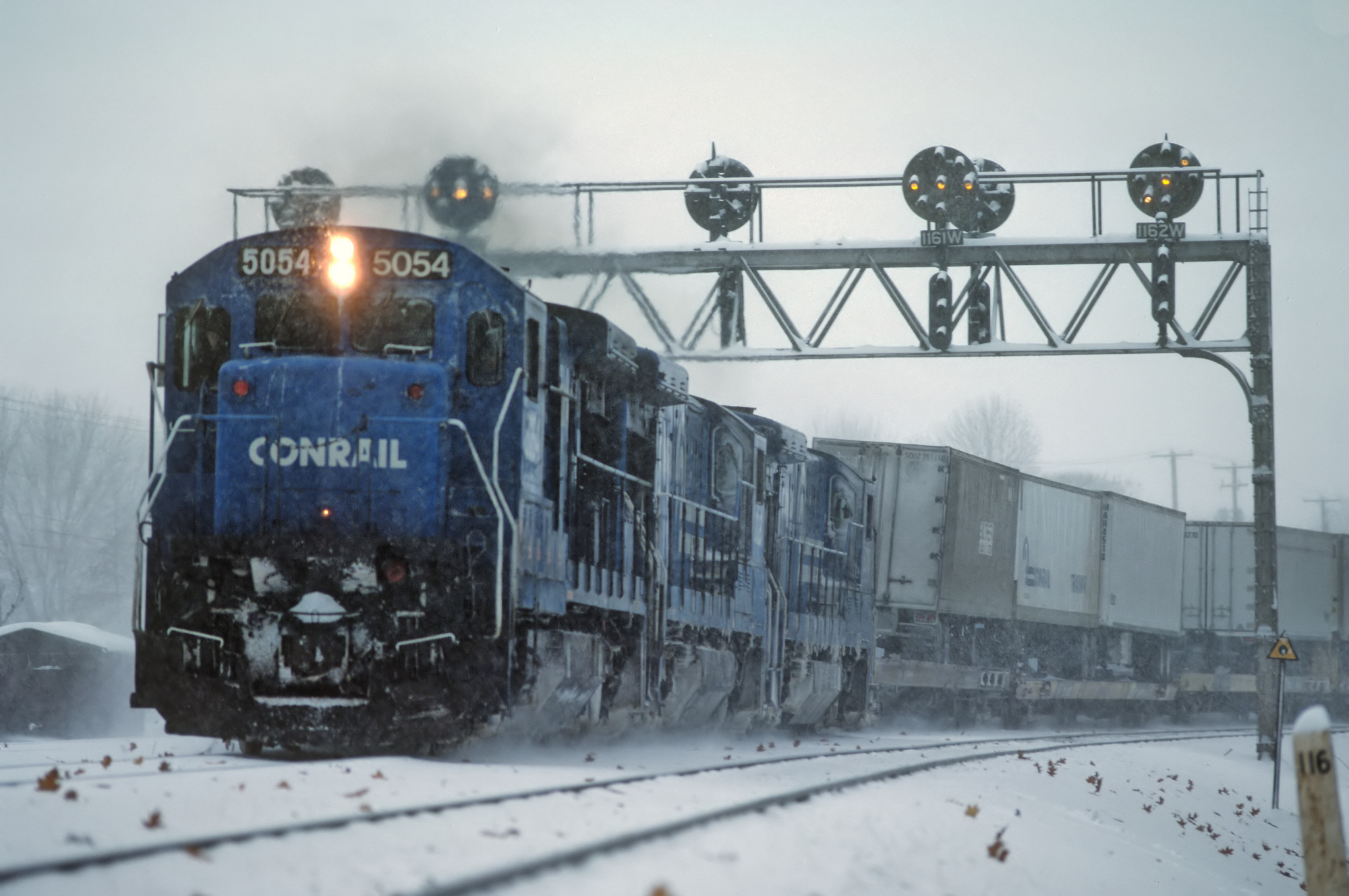
Conrail B36-7 5054 leads a freight train at Duncannon, PA

Following the 4 Cotton Belt units, GE started official B36-7 production at its Erie, PA facility. The second order for B36-7s was built for the Santa Fe in October and November 1980. Between 1983 and 1985, Conrail, Santa Fe, Southern Pacific, and Seaboard System placed further B36-7 orders. Production ended in September 1985 when the final B36-7 was built for Seaboard.

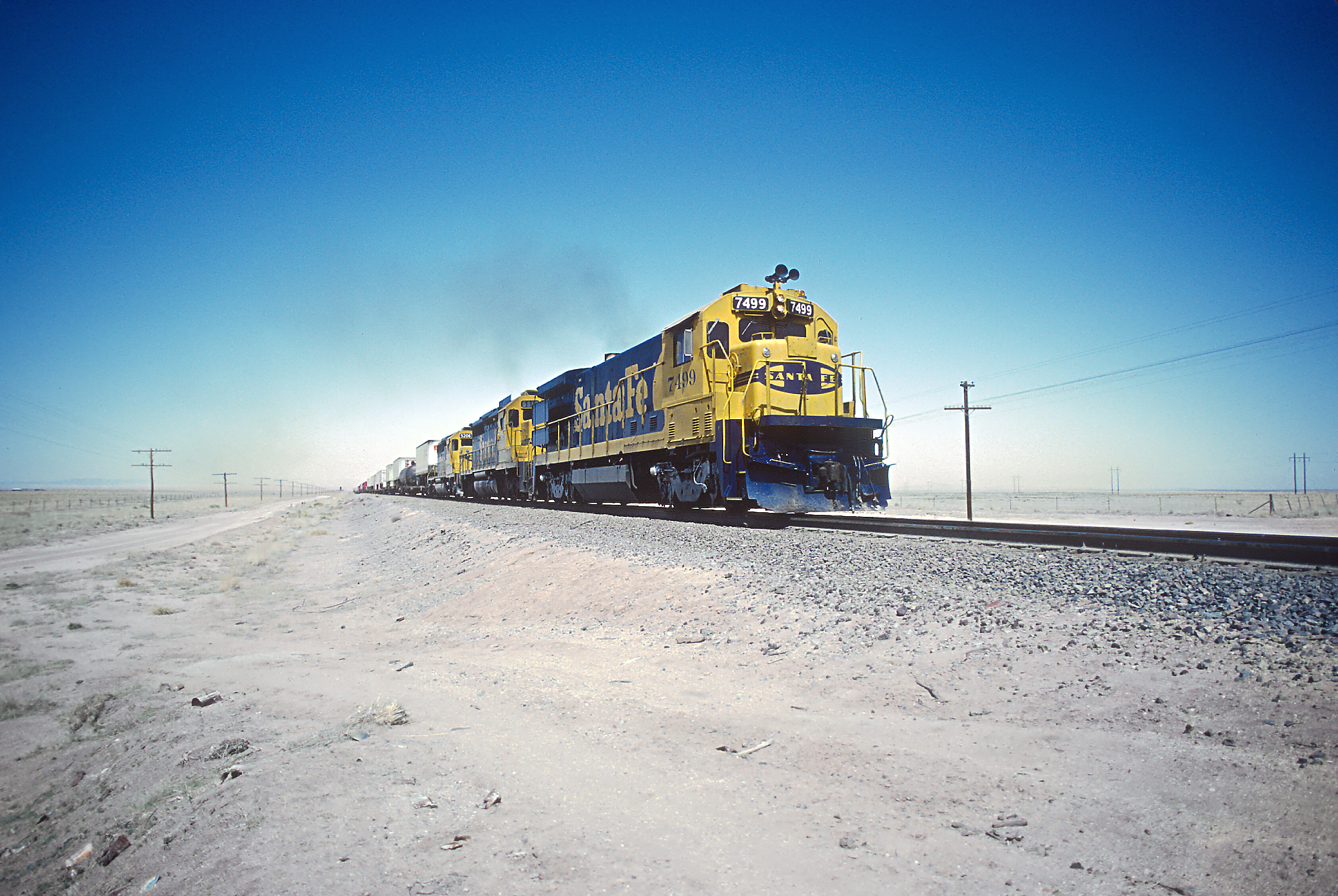
AT&SF 7499 between the sidings of Becker and Sais, NM on the Belen Cutoff between Belen and the west end of Abo Canyon in August 1983

== Original owners ==
Image	Railroad	Quantity	Road numbers	Notes
	Santa Fe	16	7484-7499	Some of the units were sold to British Columbia Railway, Renumbered 3604-3613.
	Conrail	60	5000-5059	5045 destroyed in the 1987 Maryland train collision and scrapped
	Cerrejon Coal Project (Colombia)	8	1001–1008	
	Seaboard System	120	5806-5925	To CSX; All retired as of Dec 2009. 5850 was rebuilt by NRE into a 3GS21B in 2010.
	Southern Railway	6	3815-3820	High hood.
	Southern Pacific Transportation Company	16	7754-7769	
	Cotton Belt	4	7770-7773	

== See also ==
- GE U36B
