= GE U36B =

B-B diesel-electric locomotive

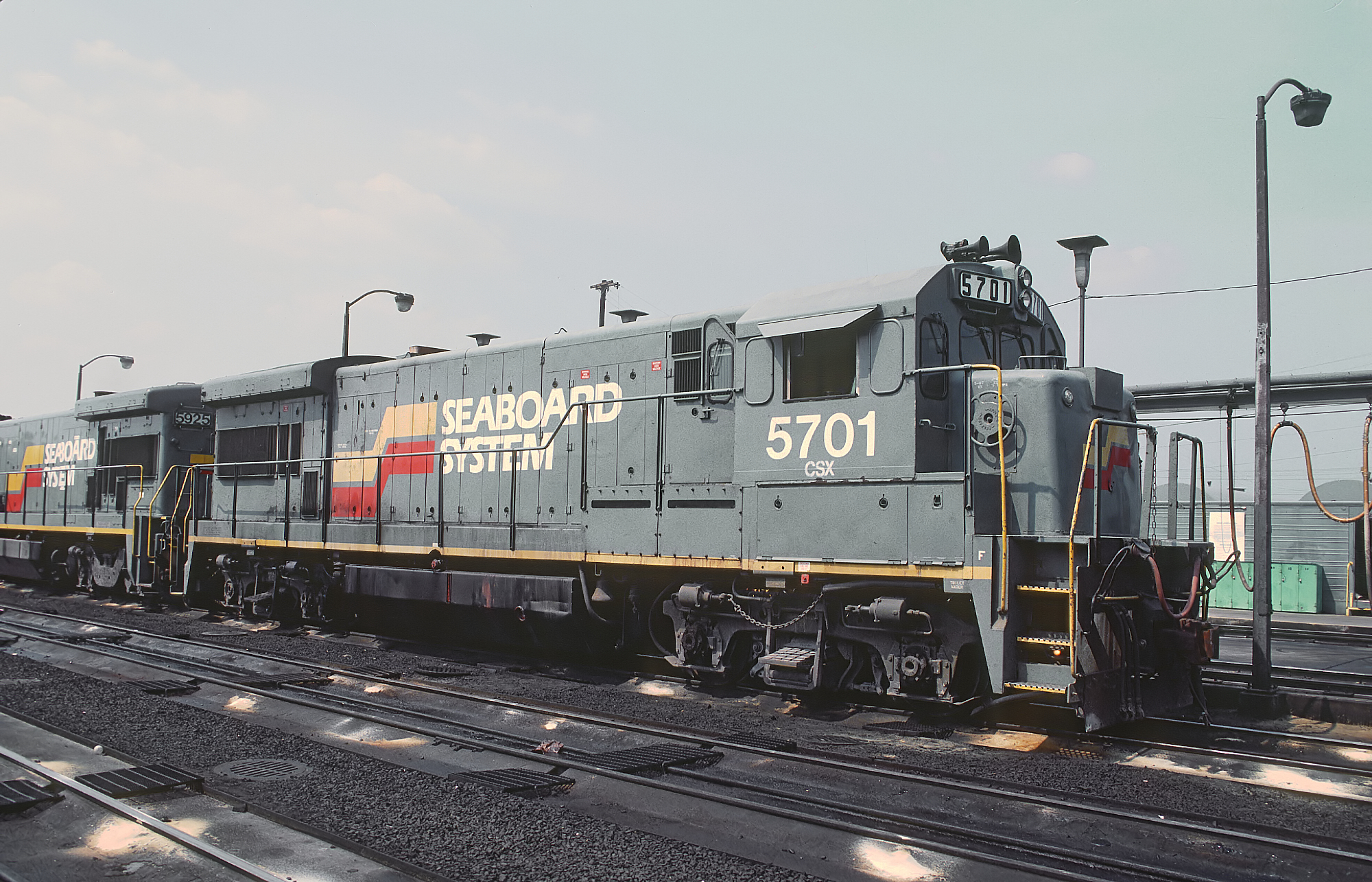
- CSX No. 5701 in Atlanta, Georgia, in 1987
Type and origin
- Power type: Diesel-electric
- Builder: GE Transportation Systems
- Build date: January 1969 – December 1974
- Total produced: 125
Specifications
- Configuration
  - AAR: B-B
- Gauge: 4 ft 8 1/2 in (1,435 mm)
- Length: 60 feet 2 inches (18.34 m)
- Loco weight: 270,000 pounds (120,000 kg)
- Prime mover: GE FDL-16
Performance figures
- Maximum speed: 75 miles per hour (121 km/h)
- Power output: 3,600 hp (2.7 MW)
Career
- Locale: Eastern and southeastern United States

The GE U36B is a four-axle 3,600 hp (2.7 MW) B-B diesel-electric locomotive produced by General Electric from 1969 to 1974. It was primarily used by the Seaboard Coast Line Railroad and its successors, although thirteen provided the power for the original Auto Train. The U36B was the last GE high-horsepower universal series locomotive.

== Design ==
General Electric's "high-horsepower" universal series locomotives were built around improvements to the 16-cylinder GE FDL-16 prime mover. The U36B, rated at 3,600 hp (2.7 MW), was the most powerful of the four-axle universal series and the last such design. It was visually indistinguishable from the GE U33B, both of which were 60 feet 2 inches (18.34 m) long. The locomotives rode on Blomberg trucks from traded-in EMD general-purpose (GP) locomotives. Each locomotive weighed 270,000 pounds (120,000 kg). The U36B shared large "bat-wing" radiators with other high-horsepower locomotives of its generation at the back.

The Seaboard locomotives had an 81:22 gear ratio, permitting a maximum speed of 75 miles per hour (121 km/h). The U36B and the six-axle GE U36C were designed to operate with the MATE (Motors for Additional Tractive Effort) slug. The MATE had four traction motors, allowing power from the locomotive to be distributed over a total of eight traction motors for double tractive effort. The Auto-Train locomotives did not have steam generators for passenger comfort; this was supplied by a separate steam generator car behind the locomotives.

== History ==
The primary purchaser of the U36B was the Seaboard Coast Line Railroad, which ordered 108 locomotives. The Auto-Train Corporation, whose Auto Train ran primarily over the Seaboard, ordered another 17, for a total production run of 125. Four of these would be delivered to Conrail after Auto-Train ran into financial difficulties. The Conrail U36B locomotives were fitted with AAR Type B trucks. The unit price was $285,000. The intended use of the U36B was "high-priority, fast freight services, such as intermodal trains."

GE manufactured the U36B between January 1969 and December 1974, during a period when railroads in the United States moved away from high-horsepower designs. There were multiple reasons for this change: rising fuel prices because of the 1973 oil crisis, higher locomotive maintenance costs, and poor wheel adhesion, resulting from the primitive state of wheel-slip control at the time. With its 900 horsepower (0.67 MW) per axle, the U36B was the "ultimate in adhesion-limited locomotives." GE would not market another such type until the Dash 7 series in the late 1970s.

Seaboard Coast Line #1776(2nd) (locomotive originally built as SCL #1813, it traded numbers with original #1776, which had already been released into service wearing the standard SCL Black with Yellow stripe paint scheme--1776(1st) became 1813(2nd and 1813(1st) became 1776(2nd)) was painted in a red-white-and-blue color scheme to honor the United States Bicentennial and made numerous special trips. The 13 Auto-Train locomotives were painted in that company's distinctive purple-white-and-red color scheme, devised by Carol Settles. Amtrak leased car six of Auto-Train's locomotives during the unusually harsh winter of 1976–1977 to provide power for the Chicago–Florida Floridian.

== Preservation ==
- CSX/MCVX #7764 (ex-Seaboard Coast Line #1776) is preserved at the Lake Shore Railway Museum in North East, Pennsylvania. It is the only known surviving U36B.

== Original owners ==
General Electric manufactured 125 locomotives between 1969 and 1975:

| Image | Railroad | Quantity | Road numbers |
|---|---|---|---|
| | Auto-Train Corporation | 13 | 4000–4012 |
| | Conrail | 4 | 2971–2974 |
| | Seaboard Coast Line Railroad | 108 | 1748–1855 |

== See also ==
- GE Universal Series
- GE B36-7
