= Projectively unique polytope =

In discrete geometry, a polytope is projectively unique (or projectively stable) if it has a unique convex realization up to projective transformations.

The study of projectively unique polytopes was initiated by Geoffrey C. Shephard, Micha Perles, Peter McMullen and Branko Grünbaum. Later significant contributions are also due to Karim Adiprasito and Günter M. Ziegler.

== Introduction ==
Two convex polytope $P,Q\subset\Bbb R^n$ are combinatorially equivalent if they have the same number of faces with the same incidence relations between them. Formally this means that $P$ and $Q$ have isomorphic face lattices, or equivalently, isomorphic underlying abstract polytopes. One also says that both $P$ and $Q$ are realizations of the face lattice (or abstract polytope).

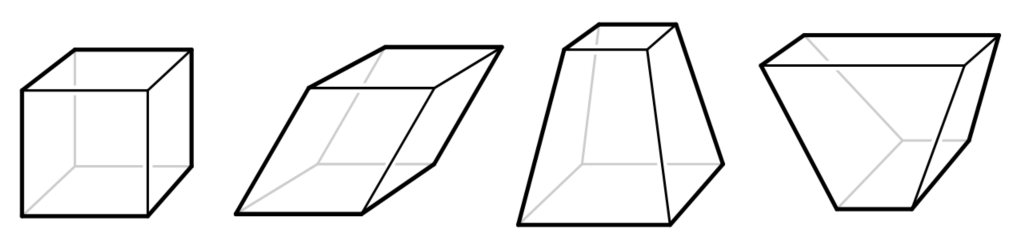
Different realizations of the cube. From left to right: 1) the standard cube; 2) an affine transformation of the standard cube; 3) a projective transformation of the standard cube that is not an affine transformation; 4) a realization of the cube that is not a projective transformation of the standard cube.

Given a convex polytope $P\subset\Bbb R^n$ many combinatorially equivalent polytopes can be generated through transformation of the ambient space, such as isometries or affine transformations. The largest class of transformations of Euclidean space that preserves coplanarity, and hence maps polytopes onto combinatorially equivalent polytopes, is the class of projective transformations. A polytope $P$ is projectively unique if all other realizations are obtained through projective transformations; or in other words, if $P$ has a unique convex realization up to projective transformations.

For example, simplices, such as triangles and tetrahedra, are projectively unique. In contrast, the cube is not projectively unique, as it has realizations that are not projectively equivalent to the standard cube (see the figure).

== Known projectively unique polytopes ==
Projective transformations on $n$-dimensional Euclidean space can map any $n+2$ points onto any other $n+2$ points. Hence, any $n$-dimensional polytope with at most $n+2$ vertices is projectively unique. Being projectively unique is moreover closed under polar duality. Since duality swaps vertices and facets, any $n$-dimensional polytope with at most $n+2$ facets is projectively unique as well. This shows that, for example, the product of two simplices is projectively unique (such as the (3,3)-duoprism). In dimension up to three, these are the only polytopes that are projectively unique, but in dimensions $n\ge 4$ there are examples with more than $n+2$ vertices and facets.

=== Dimension two ===
The following is the complete list of projectively unique polytopes in dimension two:

- triangle
- quadrangle

=== Dimension three ===
A 3-polytope is projectively unique if and only if it has at most nine edges. The following is therefore the complete list of projectively unique polytopes in dimension three:

- tetrahedron
- square pyramid
- triangular prism
- triangular bipyramid

=== Dimension four ===
The following list of projectively unique 4-polytopes was compiled by Geoffrey C. Shephard (but never formally published by himself) and is conjectured to be complete:

#	construction	dual	f-vector	description
1	$\Delta_4$	1*	(5,10,10,5)	4-simplex
2	$\square\star \Delta_1$	2*	(6,11,11,6)	join of square and line segment
3	$(\Delta_2\oplus \Delta_1)\star \Delta_0$	4	(6,14,15,7)	pyramid over a triangular bipyramid
4	$(\Delta_2\times \Delta_1)\star \Delta_0$	3	(7,15,14,6)	pyramid over a triangular prism
5	$\Delta_3\oplus\Delta_1$	6	(6,14,16,8)	tetrahedral bipyramid
6	$\Delta_3\times\Delta_1$	5	(8,16,14,6)	tetrahedral prism
7	$\Delta_2\oplus\Delta_2$	8	(6,15,18,9)	cyclic polytope C(6,4)
8	$\Delta_2\times\Delta_2$	7	(9,18,15,6)	(3,3)-duoprism
9	$(\square,v)\oplus(\square,w)$	10	(7,17,18,8)	vertex sum of two squares
10	$((\square,v)\oplus(\square,w))^\circ$	9	(8,18,17,7)	the dual of $(\square,v)\oplus(\square,w)$
11	$(\Delta_2\times\Delta_1,v)\oplus \Delta_1$	11*	(7,17,17,7)	subdirect sum of a triangular prism and a line segment at a vertex of the prism

* self-dual

=== Operations ===
McMullen showed that projectively unique polytopes are closed under the following operations:

- The join $P\star Q$ of two polytopes is projectively unique if and only if the $P$ and $Q$ are projectively unique.
- The vertex sum $(P,v)\oplus (Q,w)$ of two projectively unique polytopes is projectively unique.
- If $P$ is projectively unique and $v$ is a vertex of $P$ so that $P$ is not a vertex sum with distinguished vertex $v$, then the subdirect sum $(P,v)\oplus\Delta_1$ is projectively unique (this is also known as splitting the vertex $v$).

These operations are sufficient to generate Shephard's list of projectively unique 4-polytopes. But not all projectively unique polytopes can be generated using these operations, for example, Perles' non-rational polytope (see below).

=== Other examples ===
Perles & Shephard (1974) used Gale diagrams to construct many projectively unique polytopes and showed that their number increases at least exponentially with the dimension. In general, one can start from a projectively unique point-line configuration, for example, obtained by encoding a polynomial with a single real zero. After doubling all points this can be interpreted as the Gale diagram of a projectively unique polytope. Starting from a suitable configuration (for example, the Perles configuration) this can be used to construct projectively unique polytopes that have no realization with rational coordinates.

Faces of projectively unique polytopes need not be themselves projectively unique. In 2013 Adiprasito & Padrol showed that every polytope with algebraic vertex coordinates appears as a face of a projectively unique polytope. This shows that projectively unique polytopes satisfy a form of universality and that no simple structure theory can be expected.

In 2015 Adiprasito & Ziegler constructed infinitely many distinct projectively unique polytopes in dimension 69. There are only finitely many projectively unique polytopes in dimension two and three, and it is an open question whether this is also the case in dimension four.

== Linearly unique polytopes ==
A centrally symmetric polytope $P$ is linearly unique (or linearly stable) if it has a unique origin symmetric realization up to linear transformations. The class of linear unique polytopes is also closed under polar duality. Examples of linearly unique polytopes are cubes and crosspolytopes in all dimensions, and more generally, all Hanner polytopes. In 1969 Peter McMullen showed that every centrally symmetric 0/1-polytope is linearly unique. In the same paper McMullen sketches an argument that this gives a complete characterization of linearly unique polytopes. Later, David Assaf (1976) constructs a counterexample, showing that McMullen's argument must be incomplete. The counterexample provided is a centrally symmetric 0/1-polytope whose dual cannot be realized as a 0/1-polytope.

== Generalizations ==
For each natural number $k\ge 1$ there are polytopes with precisely $k$ distinct convex realizations up to projective transformations. One way to construct such polytopes is using Gale diagrams. One starts from a point-line configurations with precisely $k$ distinct realizations (up to projective transformations). After doubling all points one can interpret it as the Gale diagram of a convex polytope.
