= Cubical bipyramid =

4-D object; direct sum of a cube and a segment

Cubic bipyramid
Orthographic projection 8 red vertices and 12 blue edges of central cube, with 2 yellow apex vertices.
Type	Polyhedral bipyramid
Schläfli symbol	{4,3} + { } dt{2,3,4}
Coxeter-Dynkin	
Cells	12 {4}∨{ } (2×6)
Faces	30 triangles (2×12+6)
Edges	28 (2×8+12)
Vertices	10 (2+8)
Dual	Octahedral prism
Symmetry group	[2,4,3], order 96
Properties	convex, regular-faced,CRF polytope, Hanner polytope

In 4-dimensional geometry, the cubical bipyramid is the direct sum of a cube and a segment, {4,3} + { }. Each face of a central cube is attached with two square pyramids, creating 12 square pyramidal cells, 30 triangular faces, 28 edges, and 10 vertices. A cubical bipyramid can be seen as two cubic pyramids augmented together at their base.

It is the dual of a octahedral prism.

Being convex and regular-faced, it is a CRF polytope.

== Coordinates ==
It is a Hanner polytope with coordinates:

- [2] (0, 0, 0; ±1)
- [8] (±1, ±1, ±1; 0)

== See also ==
- Tetrahedral bipyramid
- Dodecahedral bipyramid
- Icosahedral bipyramid
