= Octahedral pyramid =

4-D polyhedral pyramid

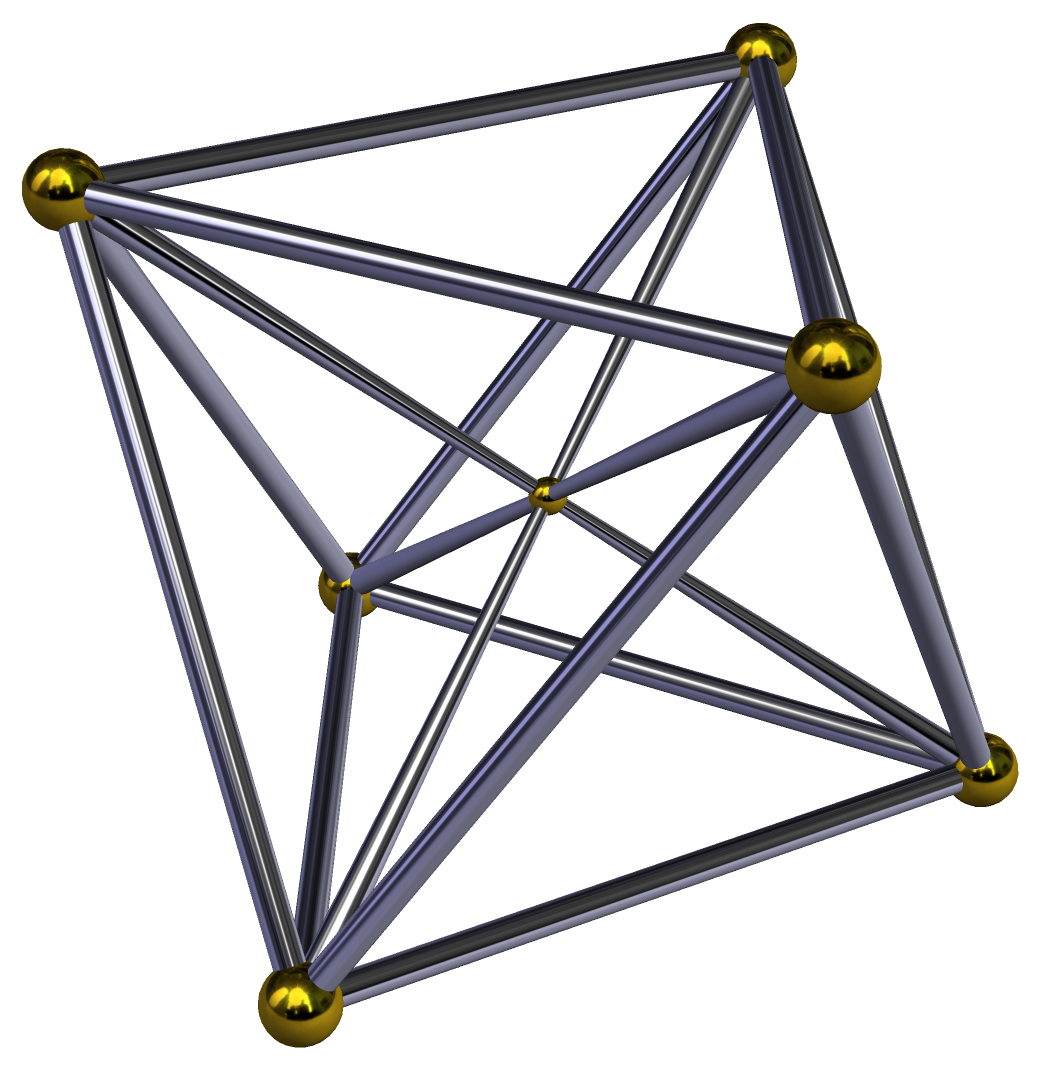
- Schlegel diagram
- Type: Polyhedral pyramid
- Schläfli symbol: ( ) ∨ {3,4} ( ) ∨ r{3,3} ( ) ∨ s{2,6} ( ) ∨ [{4} + { }] ( ) ∨ [{ } + { } + { }]
- Cells: 1 {3,4} 8 ( ) ∨ {3}
- Faces: 20 {3}
- Edges: 18
- Vertices: 7
- Symmetry group: B_{3}, [4,3,1], order 48 [3,3,1], order 24 [2^{+},6,1], order 12 [4,2,1], order 16 [2,2,1], order 8
- Dual: Cubic pyramid
- Properties: convex, regular-cells, Blind polytope

In 4-dimensional geometry, the octahedral pyramid is bounded by one octahedron on the base and 8 triangular pyramid cells which meet at the apex. Since an octahedron has a circumradius divided by edge length less than one, the triangular pyramids can be made with regular faces (as regular tetrahedrons) by computing the appropriate height.

Having all regular cells, it is a Blind polytope. Two copies can be augmented to make an octahedral bipyramid which is also a Blind polytope.

== Occurrences of the octahedral pyramid ==
The regular 16-cell has octahedral pyramids around every vertex, with the octahedron passing through the center of the 16-cell. Therefore placing two regular octahedral pyramids base to base constructs a 16-cell. The 16-cell tessellates 4-dimensional space as the 16-cell honeycomb.

Exactly 24 regular octahedral pyramids will fit together around a vertex in four-dimensional space (the apex of each pyramid). This construction yields a 24-cell with octahedral bounding cells, surrounding a central vertex with 24 edge-length long radii. The 4-dimensional content of a unit-edge-length 24-cell is 2, so the content of the regular octahedral pyramid is 1/12. The 24-cell tessellates 4-dimensional space as the 24-cell honeycomb.

The octahedral pyramid is the vertex figure for a truncated 5-orthoplex,.

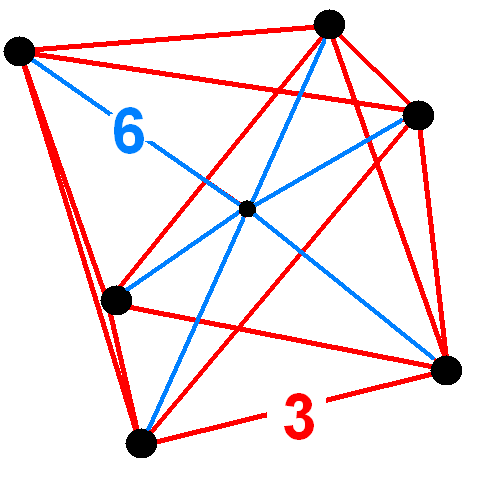

The graph of the octahedral pyramid is the only possible minimal counterexample to Negami's conjecture, that the connected graphs with planar covers are themselves projective-planar.

Example 4-dimensional coordinates, 6 points in first 3 coordinates for cube and 4th dimension for the apex.
$$\begin{array}{lllr}
(\pm 1, & 0,     & 0;    & 0) \\
(0,     & \pm 1, & 0;    & 0) \\
(0,     & 0,     & \pm1; & 0) \\
(0,     & 0,     & 0;    & \ 1)
\end{array}$$

== Other polytopes ==
=== Cubic pyramid ===
The dual to the octahedral pyramid is a cubic pyramid, seen as a cubic base and 6 square pyramids meeting at an apex.

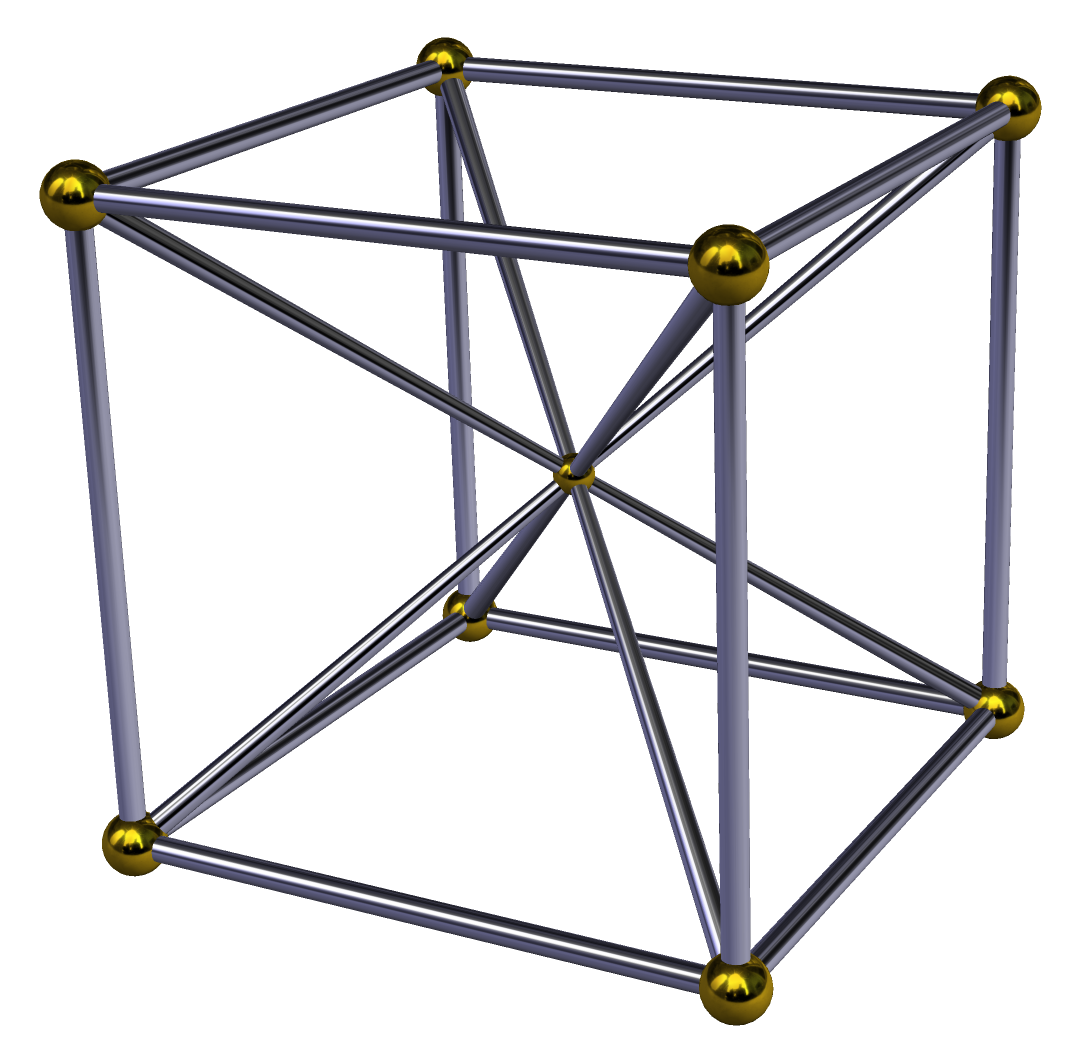

Example 4-dimensional coordinates, 8 points in first 3 coordinates for cube and 4th dimension for the apex.
$$\begin{array}{lllr}
(\pm 1, & \pm 1, & \pm 1; & 0) \\
(0,     & 0,     & 0;     & 1)
\end{array}$$

=== Square-pyramidal pyramid ===
Square-pyramidal pyramid
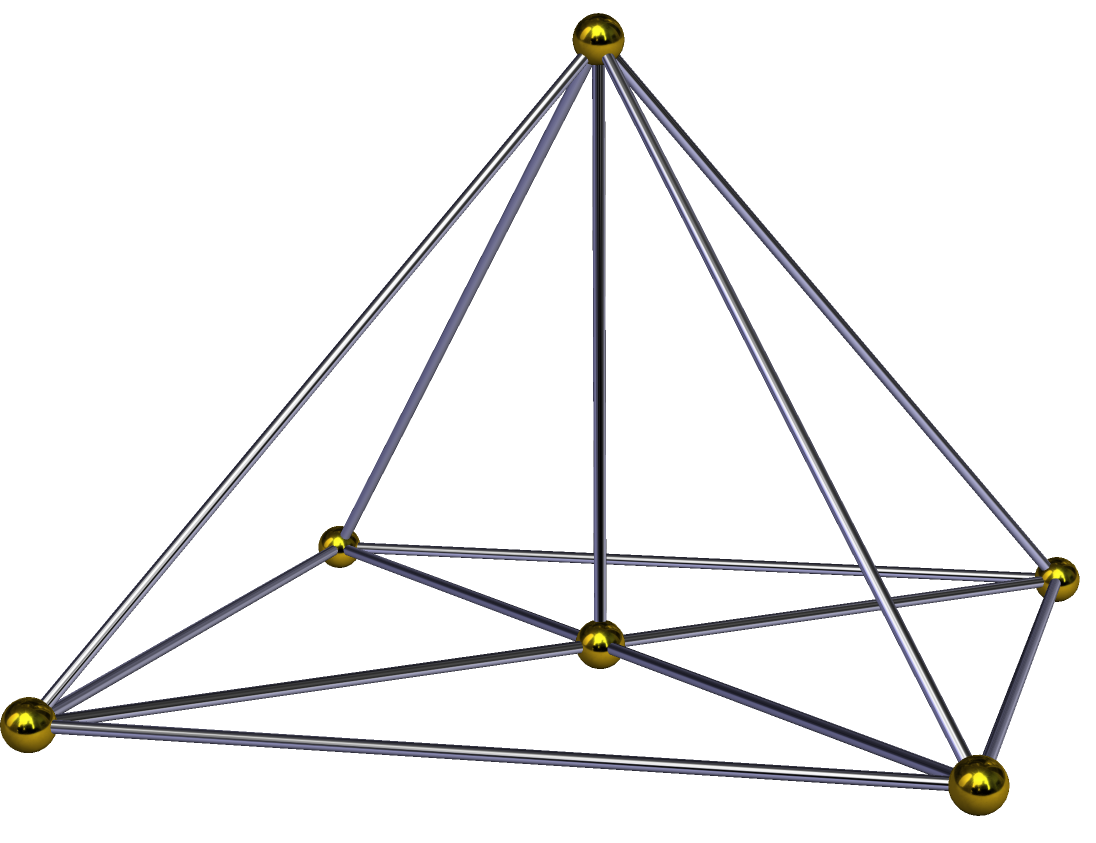
- Type: Polyhedral pyramid
- Schläfli symbol: ( ) ∨ [( ) ∨ {4}] [( )∨( )] ∨ {4} = { } ∨ {4} { } ∨ [{ } × { }] { } ∨ [{ } + { }]
- Cells: 2 ( )∨{4} 4 ( )∨{3}
- Faces: 12 {3} 1 {4}
- Edges: 13
- Vertices: 6
- Symmetry group: [4,1,1], order 8 [4,2,1], order 16 [2,2,1], order 8
- Dual: Self-dual
- Properties: convex, regular-faced

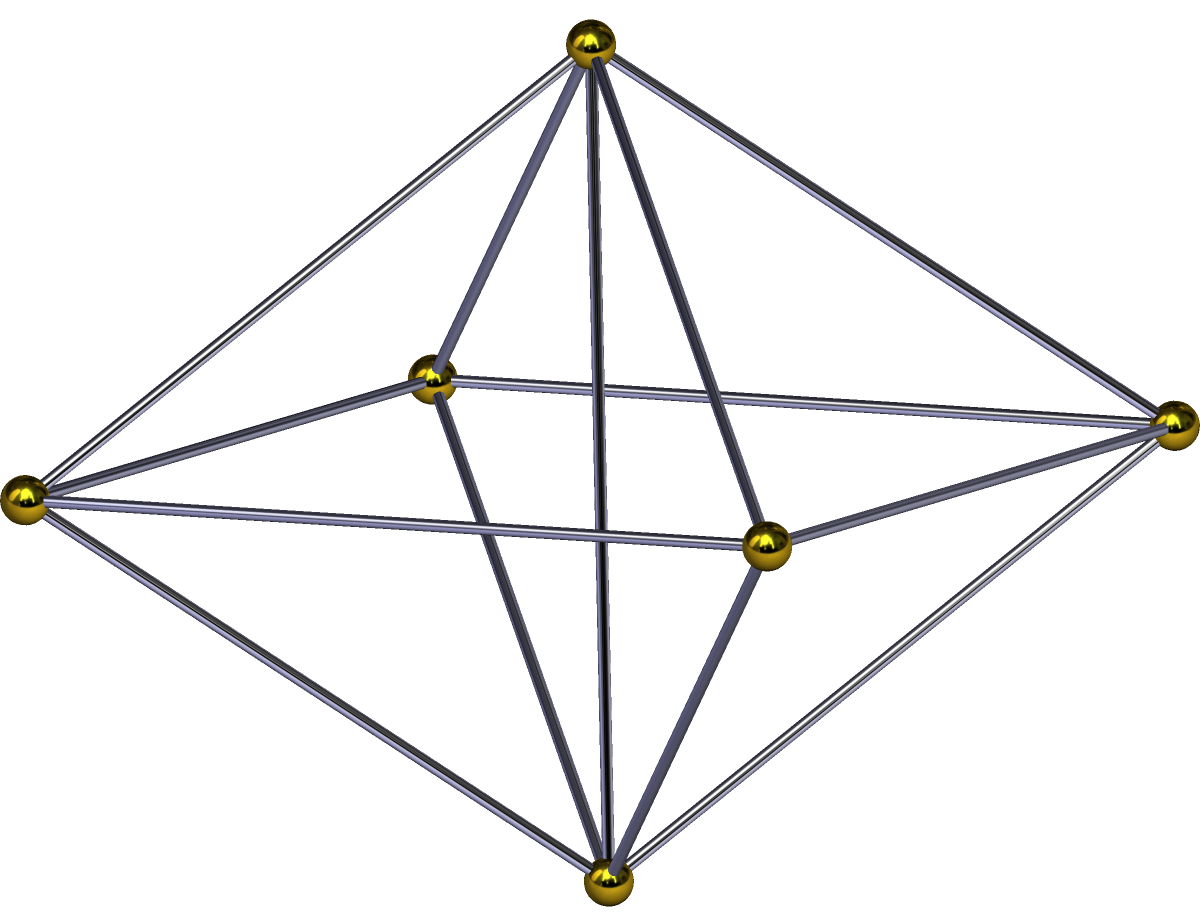
Edge-centered view

The square-pyramidal pyramid, ( ) ∨ [( ) ∨ {4}], is a bisected octahedral pyramid. It has a square pyramid base, and 4 tetrahedrons along with another one more square pyramid meeting at the apex. It can also be seen in an edge-centered projection as a square bipyramid with four tetrahedra wrapped around the common edge. If the height of the two apexes are the same, it can be given a higher symmetry name [( ) ∨ ( )] ∨ {4} = { } ∨ {4}, joining an edge to a perpendicular square.

The square-pyramidal pyramid can be distorted into a rectangular-pyramidal pyramid, { } ∨ [{ } × { }] or a rhombic-pyramidal pyramid, { } ∨ [{ } + { }], or other lower symmetry forms.

The square-pyramidal pyramid exists as a vertex figure in uniform polytopes of the form, including the bitruncated 5-orthoplex and bitruncated tesseractic honeycomb.

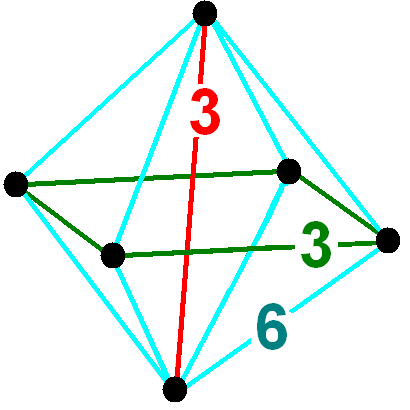
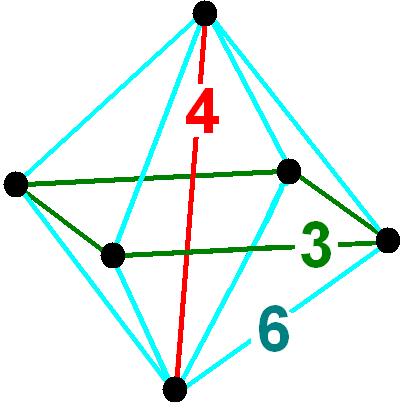

Example 4-dimensional coordinates, 2 coordinates for square, and axial points for pyramidal points.
$$\begin{array}{lllr}
(\pm 1, & \pm 1; & 0; & 0) \\
(0,     & 0;     & 1; & 0) \\
(0,     & 0;     & 0; & \ \ 1)
\end{array}$$
