= Roswitha Blind =

German mathematician and politician

Roswitha Blind (also published as Roswitha Hammer) is a German mathematician, specializing in convex geometry, discrete geometry, and polyhedral combinatorics, and a politician and organizer for the Social Democratic Party of Germany in Stuttgart.

== Mathematics ==
As Roswitha Hammer, Blind completed a Ph.D. in 1974 at the University of Stuttgart. Her dissertation, Über konvexe Strukturen und die Beziehungen zur elementaren Konvexität, concerned convex geometry and discrete geometry and was supervised by Kurt Leichtweiss.

She is best known in mathematics for a 1987 publication with Peter Mani-Levitska in which, solving a conjecture of Micha Perles, she and Mani-Levitska proved that the combinatorial structure of simple polytopes is completely determined by their graphs. This result has been called the Blind–Mani theorem or the Perles–Blind–Mani theorem.

In a 1979 publication, she introduced a class of convex polytopes sometimes called the Blind polytopes, generalizing the semiregular polytopes and Johnson solids, in which all faces are regular polytopes.

== Politics ==
Blind became a city councillor in the Möhringen-Vaihingen district of Stuttgart in 2004, stepping down from that seat in 2009 in order to become chair of the Social Democratic Party of Germany local council group. As councillor, in order to better serve the youth of her district, she became chair of a local football club, 1. FC Lauchhau-Lauchäcker, in 2006, also serving as president of the Stuttgart Sports Forum.

She retired from politics in 2014, and from her position with the football club in 2016.
