= Icosahedral pyramid =

Icosahedral pyramid
Schlegel diagram
Type	Polyhedral pyramid	
Schläfli symbol	( ) ∨ {3,5}	
Cells	21	1 {3,5} 20 ( ) ∨ {3}
Faces	50	20+30 {3}
Edges	12+30	
Vertices	13	
Dual	Dodecahedral pyramid	
Symmetry group	H_{3}, [5,3,1], order 120	
Properties	convex, regular-cells, Blind polytope	

The icosahedral pyramid is a four-dimensional convex polytope, bounded by one icosahedron as its base and by 20 triangular pyramid cells which meet at its apex. Since an icosahedron's circumradius is less than its edge length, the tetrahedral pyramids can be made with regular faces.

Having all regular cells, it is a Blind polytope. Two copies can be augmented to make an icosahedral bipyramid which is also a Blind Polytope.

The regular 600-cell has icosahedral pyramids around every vertex.

The dual to the icosahedral pyramid is the dodecahedral pyramid, seen as a dodecahedral base, and 12 regular pentagonal pyramids meeting at an apex.

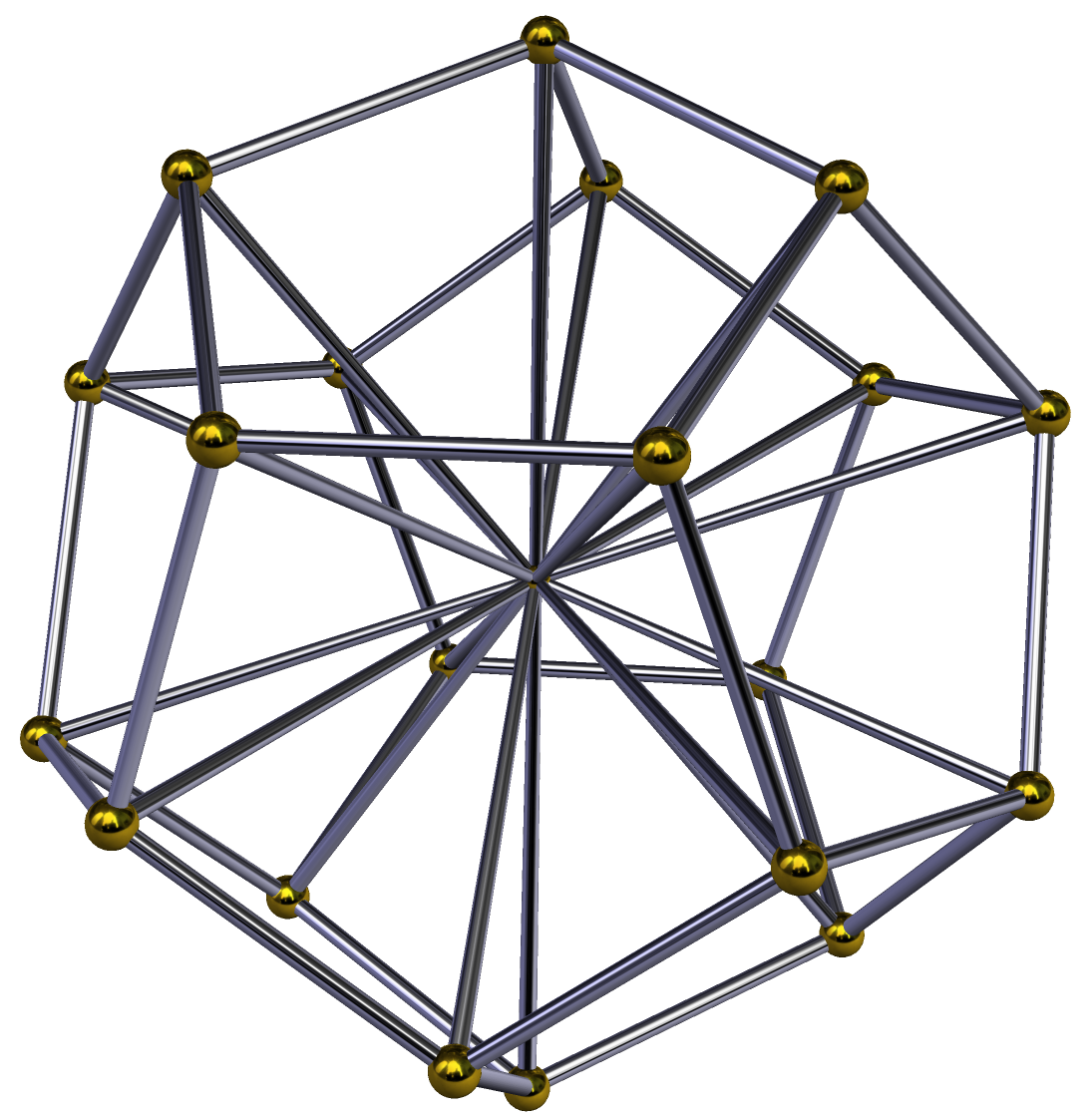

== Configuration ==
Seen in a configuration matrix, all incidence counts between elements are shown.

k-faces	f_{k}	f_{0}		f_{1}		f_{2}		f_{3}		k-verfs
( )	f_{0}	1	*	12	0	30	0	20	0	{3,5}
( )	f_{0}	*	12	1	5	5	5	5	1	{5}∨( )
( )∨( )	f_{1}	1	1	12	*	5	0	5	0	{5}
{ }	f_{1}	0	2	*	30	1	2	2	1	{ }∨( )
{ }∨( )	f_{2}	1	2	2	1	30	*	2	0	{ }
{3}	f_{2}	0	3	0	3	*	20	1	1	( )∨( )
{3}∨( )	f_{3}	1	3	3	3	3	1	20	*	( )
{3,5}	f_{3}	0	12	0	30	0	20	*	1	( )
