= Multiple edges =

In graph theory, edges incident/directed between the same vertices

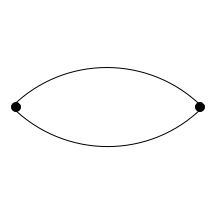
Multiple edges joining two vertices.

In graph theory, multiple edges (also called parallel edges or a multi-edge), are, in an undirected graph, two or more edges that are incident to the same two vertices, or in a directed graph, two or more edges with both the same tail vertex and the same head vertex. A simple graph has no multiple edges and no loops.

Depending on the context, a graph may be defined so as to either allow or disallow the presence of multiple edges (often in concert with allowing or disallowing loops):

- Where graphs are defined so as to allow multiple edges and loops, a graph without loops or multiple edges is often distinguished from other graphs by calling it a simple graph.
- Where graphs are defined so as to disallow multiple edges and loops, a multigraph or a pseudograph is often defined to mean a "graph" which can have multiple edges.

Multiple edges are, for example, useful in the consideration of electrical networks, from a graph theoretical point of view. Additionally, they constitute the core differentiating feature of multidimensional networks.

A planar graph remains planar if an edge is added between two vertices already joined by an edge; thus, adding multiple edges preserves planarity.

A dipole graph is a graph with two vertices, in which all edges are parallel to each other.
