= Dipole graph =

Multigraph with two vertices

- Vertices: 2
- Edges: n
- Diameter: 1 (for n ≥ 1)
- Chromatic number: 2 (for n ≥ 1)
- Chromatic index: n
- Properties: connected (for n ≥ 1) planar

In graph theory, a dipole graph, dipole, bond graph, or linkage, is a multigraph consisting of two vertices connected with a number of parallel edges. A dipole graph containing n edges is called the size-n dipole graph, and is denoted by D_{n}.

The hexagonal tiling as an abstract graph is the maximal abelian covering graph of the dipole graph D_{3}, while the diamond crystal as an abstract graph is the maximal abelian covering graph of D_{4}.

The dipole graph can be embedded on a sphere, subdividing the sphere into a hosohedron, consisting only of two-sided digons. This subdivision is a regular map, a generalization of the Platonic solids. The dual graph of the size-n dipole graph, embedded in this way, is the cycle graph C_{n}, embedded as a dihedron.
