= Icosahedral bipyramid =

4-D polytope; direct sum of an icosahedron and a segment

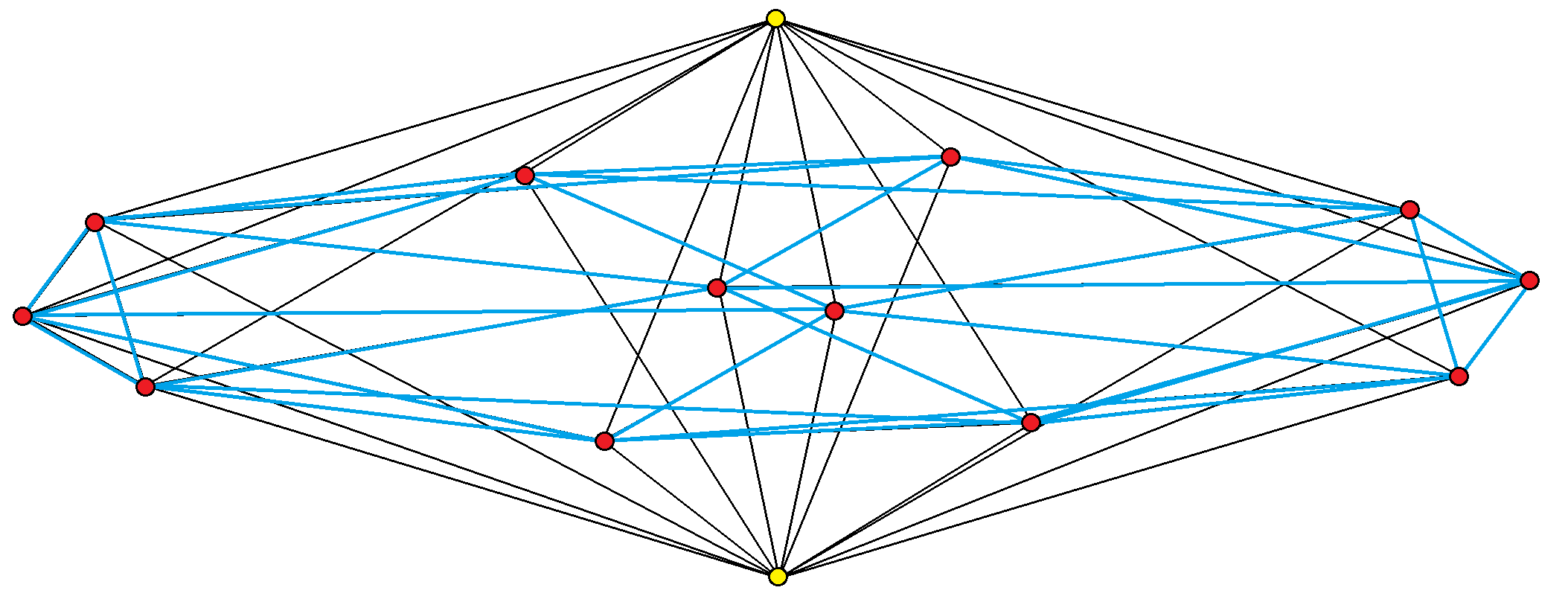
- Orthogonal projection: Base icosahedron edges (30) Base icosahedron vertices (12) Apex vertices (2) Connecting edges (24)
- Type: Polyhedral bipyramid
- Schläfli symbol: {3,5} + { } dt{2,5,3}
- Cells: 40 {3,3}
- Faces: 80 {3}
- Edges: 54 (30+12+12)
- Vertices: 14 (12+2)
- Symmetry group: [2,3,5], order 240
- Properties: convex, regular-celled, Blind polytope

In 4-dimensional geometry, the icosahedral bipyramid is the direct sum of an icosahedron and a segment, {3,5} + { }. Each face of a central icosahedron is attached with two tetrahedra, creating 40 tetrahedral cells, 80 triangular faces, 54 edges, and 14 vertices. An icosahedral bipyramid can be seen as two icosahedral pyramids augmented together at their bases.

It is the dual of a dodecahedral prism, Coxeter-Dynkin diagram, so the bipyramid can be described as. Both have Coxeter notation symmetry [2,3,5], order 240.

Having all regular cells (tetrahedra), it is a Blind polytope.

== See also ==
- Pentagonal bipyramid - A lower dimensional analogy
- Tetrahedral bipyramid
- Octahedral bipyramid - A lower symmetry form of the as 16-cell.
- Cubic bipyramid
- Dodecahedral bipyramid
