= Blind polytope =

Convex polytope composed of regular-polytope facets

In geometry, a Blind polytope is a convex polytope composed of regular polytope facets. The category was named after the German couple Gerd and Roswitha Blind, who described them in a series of papers beginning in 1979. It generalizes the set of semiregular polyhedra and Johnson solids to higher dimensions.

== Uniform cases ==
The set of convex uniform 4-polytopes (also called semiregular 4-polytopes) are completely known cases, nearly all grouped by their Wythoff constructions, sharing symmetries of the convex regular 4-polytopes and prismatic forms.

Set of convex uniform 5-polytopes, uniform 6-polytopes, uniform 7-polytopes, etc are largely enumerated as Wythoff constructions, but not known to be complete.

== Other cases ==
Pyramidal forms: (4D)

1. (Tetrahedral pyramid, ( ) ∨ {3,3}, a tetrahedron base, and 4 tetrahedral sides, a lower symmetry name of regular 5-cell.)
2. Octahedral pyramid, ( ) ∨ {3,4}, an octahedron base, and 8 tetrahedra sides meeting at an apex.
3. Icosahedral pyramid, ( ) ∨ {3,5}, an icosahedron base, and 20 tetrahedra sides.

Bipyramid forms: (4D)

1. Tetrahedral bipyramid, { } + {3,3}, a tetrahedron center, and 8 tetrahedral cells on two side.
2. (Octahedral bipyramid, { } + {3,4}, an octahedron center, and 8 tetrahedral cells on two side, a lower symmetry name of regular 16-cell.)
3. Icosahedral bipyramid, { } + {3,5}, an icosahedron center, and 40 tetrahedral cells on two sides.

Augmented forms: (4D)

- Rectified 5-cell augmented with one octahedral pyramid, adding one vertex for 11 total. It retains 5 tetrahedral cells, reduced to 4 octahedral cells and adds 8 new tetrahedral cells.

Diminished forms: (4D)

- Precisely 314,248,344 "special cuts" of the 600-cell, all but one of which (the icositetradiminished 600-cell) are non-uniform. They are created by diminishing a set of non-adjacent vertices and replacing 20 tetrahedra with an icosahedron for each selected vertex.

== Convex regular-faced polytopes ==
Blind polytopes are a subset of convex regular-faced polytopes (CRF). This much larger set allows CRF 4-polytopes to have Johnson solids as cells, as well as regular and semiregular polyhedral cells.

For example, a cubic bipyramid has 12 square pyramid cells.
