= Tetrahedral bipyramid =

Four-dimensional shape

Tetrahedral bipyramid
Orthogonal projection. 4 red vertices and 6 blue edges make central tetrahedron. 2 yellow vertices are bipyramid apexes.
| Type | Polyhedral bipyramid |
| Schläfli symbol | {3,3} + { } dt{2,3,3} |
| Coxeter diagram | |
| Cells | 8 {3,3} (4+4) |
| Faces | 16 {3} (4+6+6) |
| Edges | 14 (6+4+4) |
| Vertices | 6 (4+2) |
| Dual | Tetrahedral prism |
| Symmetry group | [2,3,3], order 48 |
| Properties | convex, regular-faced, Blind polytope, projectively unique |

In 4-dimensional geometry, the tetrahedral bipyramid is the direct sum of a tetrahedron and a segment, {3,3} + { }. Each face of a central tetrahedron is attached with two tetrahedra, creating 8 tetrahedral cells, 16 triangular faces, 14 edges, and 6 vertices. A tetrahedral bipyramid can be seen as two tetrahedral pyramids augmented together at their base.

It is the dual of a tetrahedral prism,, so it can also be given a Coxeter-Dynkin diagram,, and both have Coxeter notation symmetry [2,3,3], order 48.

Being convex with all regular cells (tetrahedra) means that it is a Blind polytope.

This bipyramid exists as the cells of the dual of the uniform rectified 5-simplex, and rectified 5-cube or the dual of any uniform 5-polytope with a tetrahedral prism vertex figure. And, as well, it exists as the cells of the dual to the rectified 24-cell honeycomb.

== See also ==
- Triangular bipyramid - A lower dimensional analogy of the tetrahedral bipyramid.
- Octahedral bipyramid - A lower symmetry form of the as 16-cell.
- Cubic bipyramid
- Dodecahedral bipyramid
- Icosahedral bipyramid
