= Cubic pyramid =

4-D convex polytope

- Type: Polyhedral pyramid
- Schläfli symbol: ( ) ∨ {4,3} ( ) ∨ [{4} × { }] ( ) ∨ [{ } × { } × { }]
- Cells: 1 cube 6 square pyramids
- Faces: 12 triangles 6 squares
- Edges: 20
- Vertices: 9
- Coxeter group: B_{3}
- Symmetry group: [4,3,1], order 48 [4,2,1], order 16 [2,2,1], order 8
- Dual: Octahedral pyramid
- Properties: convex, regular-faced

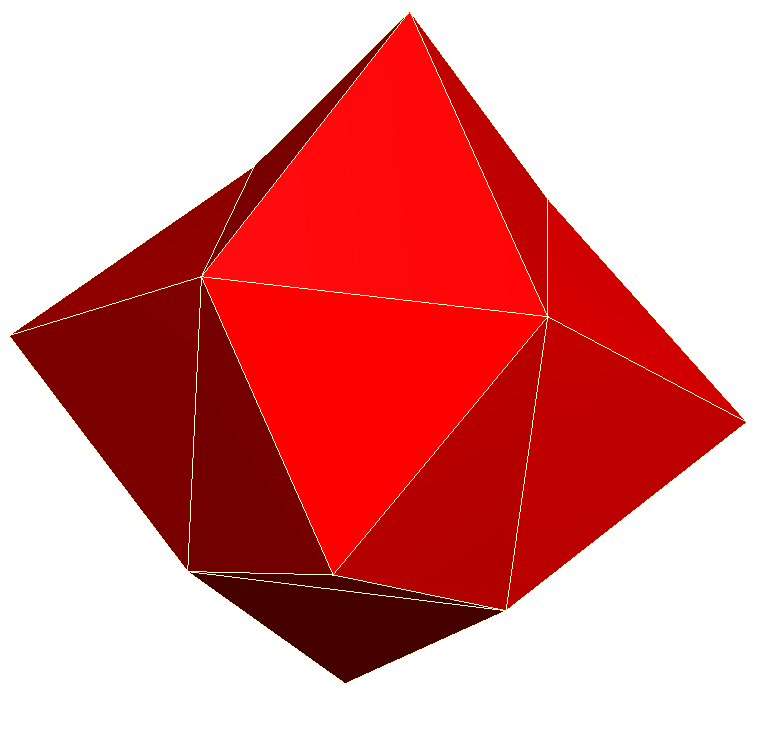
Net

In four-dimensional geometry, the cubic pyramid is bounded by one cube on the base and 6 square pyramid cells which meet at the apex. Since a cube has a circumradius divided by edge length less than one, the square pyramids can be made with regular faces by computing the appropriate height.

== Construction and properties ==
A cubic pyramid has nine vertices, twenty edges, and eighteen faces (which include twelve triangles and six squares). It has seven cells, six are square pyramids and one is a cube. By the calculation of Euler's characteristic for a four-dimensional polytope, the cubic pyramid is $V - E + F - C = 0$; the letter $V$, $E$, $F$, and $C$ designates the number of vertices, edges, faces, and cells of a cubic pyramid.

Exactly eight regular cubic pyramids will fit together around a vertex in four-dimensional space (the apex of each pyramid). This construction yields a tesseract with eight cubical bounding cells, surrounding a central vertex with 16 edge-length long radii. The tesseract tessellates four-dimensional space as the tesseractic honeycomb. The 4-dimensional content of a unit-edge-length tesseract is 1, so the content of the regular cubic pyramid is 1/8.

The regular 24-cell has cubic pyramids around every vertex. Placing eight cubic pyramids on the cubic bounding cells of a tesseract is Gosset's construction of the 24-cell. Thus, the 24-cell is constructed from exactly 16 cubic pyramids. The 24-cell tessellates 4-dimensional space as the 24-cell honeycomb.

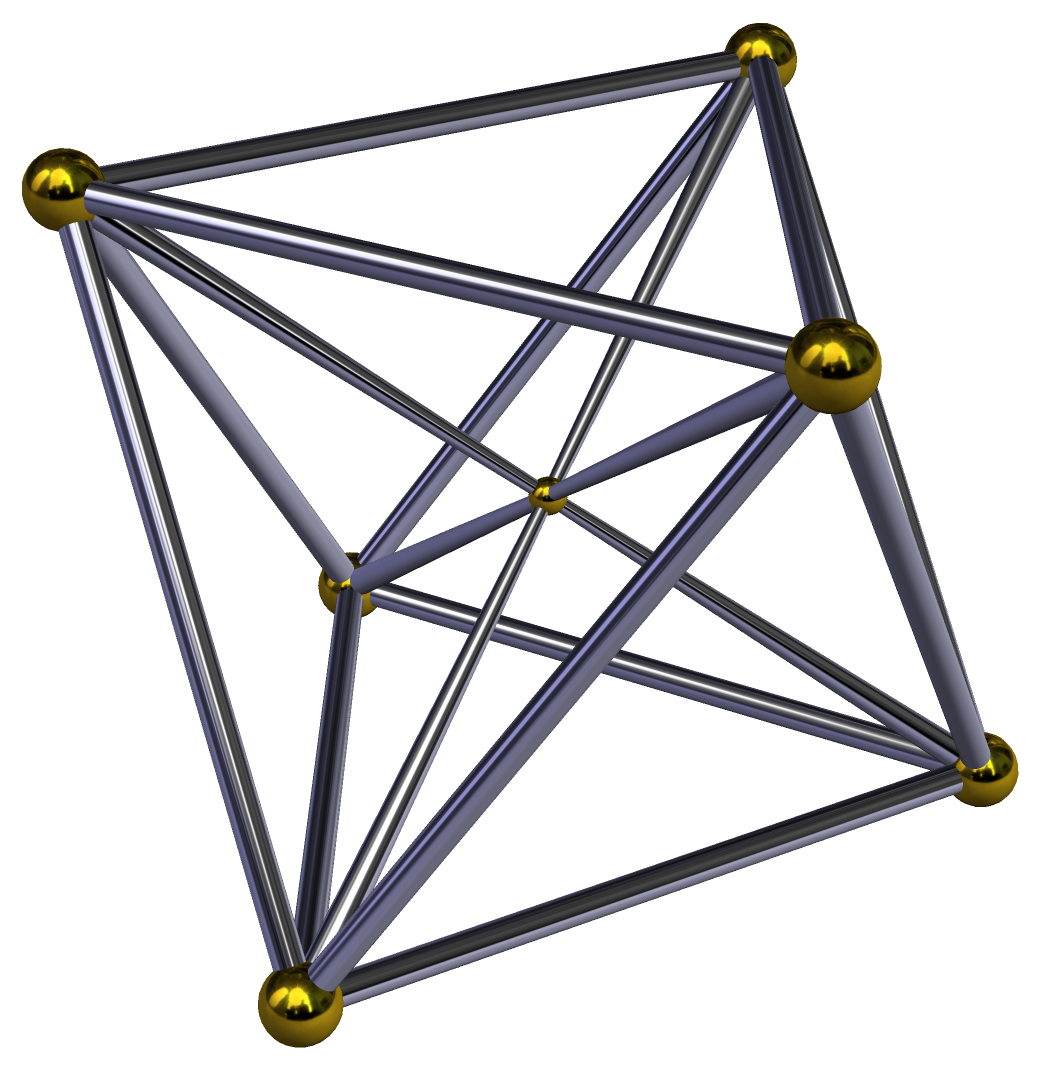
Octahedral pyramid, the dual of a cubic pyramid

The dual four-dimensional polytope of a cubic pyramid is an octahedral pyramid, seen as an octahedral base, and eight regular tetrahedra meeting at an apex.

The cubic pyramid can be folded from a three-dimensional net in the form of a non-convex tetrakis hexahedron, obtained by gluing square pyramids onto the faces of a cube, and folded along the squares where the pyramids meet the cube.
