= Hyperpyramid =

N-dimensional generalisation of a pyramid

2-dimensional hyperpyramid with a line segment as base

4-dimensional hyperpyramid with a cube as base

In geometry, a hyperpyramid is a generalisation of the normal pyramid to n dimensions.

In the case of the pyramid one connects all vertices of the base (a polygon in a plane) to a point outside the plane, which is the peak. The pyramid's height is the distance of the peak from the plane. This construction gets generalised to n dimensions. The base becomes a (n – 1)-polytope in a (n – 1)-dimensional hyperplane. A point called apex is located outside the hyperplane and gets connected to all the vertices of the polytope and the distance of the apex from the hyperplane is called height. This construct is called a n-dimensional hyperpyramid.

A normal triangle is a 2-dimensional hyperpyramid, the tetrahedron or triangular pyramid is a 3-dimensional hyperpyramid, and the pentachoron or tetrahedral pyramid is a 4-dimensional hyperpyramid with a tetrahedron as base.

The n-dimensional volume of a n-dimensional hyperpyramid can be computed as follows:
$$V_n = \frac{A \cdot h}{n}$$
Here V_{n} denotes the n-dimensional volume of the hyperpyramid, A the (n – 1)-dimensional volume of the base and h the height, that is the distance between the apex and the (n – 1)-dimensional hyperplane containing the base A. For n = 2, 3 the formula above yields the standard formulas for the area of a triangle and the volume of a pyramid.

== Elements ==
A hyperpyramid with a polyhedral base with f-vector (v,e,f) (vertices, edges, and faces), will have a new f-vector (1+v, v+e, e+f, f+1).

For example, a cube has f-vector (8,12,6), 8 vertices, 12 edges, and 6 square faces. Its cubic pyramid has 1+8 vertices, 20 edges (8 lateral, and 12 base), 18 faces (12 lateral triangles and 6 base squares), and 7 cells (6 lateral square pyramids and 1 cubic base).

In a general for n-polytopes, extended f-vector elements expand like polynomial expansion. An extended f-vector will be (1,f_{0},f_{1},f_{2},f_{n-1},1) transform to polynomial coefficients, (1+f_{0}⋅x+f_{1}⋅x^{2}+f_{2}⋅x^{3}+...+x^{n})(1+x). Abstractly, this is a join operator, making new elements by joining all permutations of cross elements, including 1 nullitope (f_{0}), and 1 body (f_{n}). The apex point has no proper elements, just the 1 nullitope and 1 body.

A n-simplex is a recursive pyramid of points (1-simplex, base point) line segment to (2-simplex, base segment) triangle to (3-simplex, base triangle) tetrahedron to (4-simplex, base tetrahedron) 5-cell, etc. Their extended f-vector follows Pascal triangle, like coefficients (1+x)^{n+1} (joining n+1 points). The first and last coefficients are the 1 nullitope and 1 body.
