= Micha Perles =

Israeli mathematician

Micha Asher Perles
- מיכה פרלס
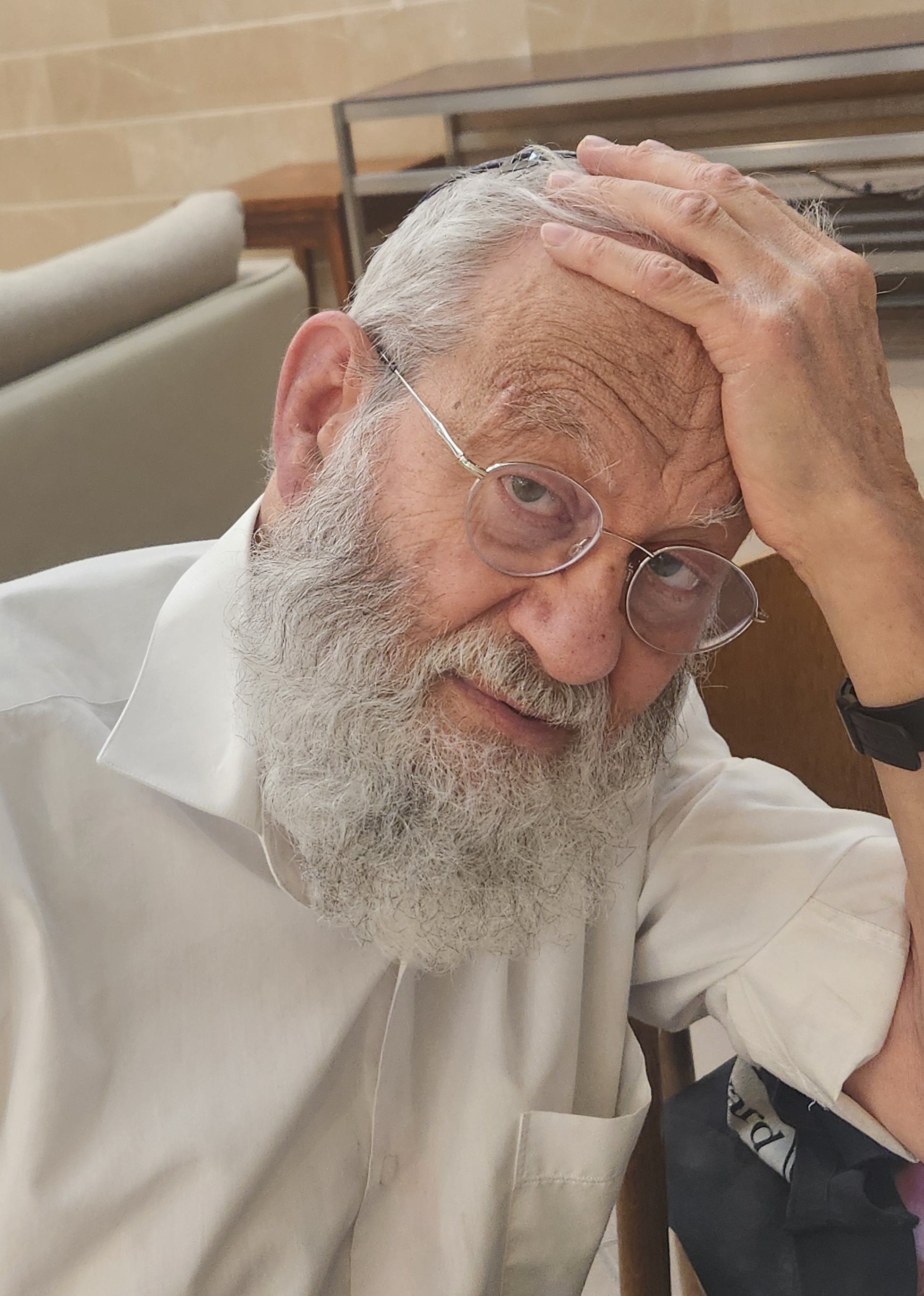
- Born: Jerusalem
- Education: Hebrew University
- Known for: Perles configuration Perles–Sauer–Shelah lemma pumping lemma
- Scientific career
- Fields: Graph theory Convex geometry Combinatorics
- Thesis: (1964)
- Doctoral advisor: Branko Grünbaum
- Doctoral students: Noga Alon; Gil Kalai; Nati Linial

Micha Asher Perles (Hebrew: מיכה פרלס, born 1936) is an Israeli mathematician working in geometry and combinatorics, a professor emeritus at the Hebrew University. He earned his Ph.D. in 1964 from the Hebrew University, under the supervision of Branko Grünbaum. His contributions include:

- The Perles configuration, a set of nine points in the Euclidean plane whose collinearities can be realized only by using irrational numbers as coordinates. Perles used this configuration to prove the existence of irrational polytopes in higher dimensions.
- The Perles–Sauer–Shelah lemma, a result in extremal set theory whose proof was credited to Perles by Saharon Shelah.
- The pumping lemma for context-free languages, a widely used method for proving that a language is not context-free that Perles discovered with Yehoshua Bar-Hillel and Eli Shamir.

Notable students of Perles include Noga Alon, Gil Kalai, and Nati Linial.
