= Order polynomial =

The order polynomial is a polynomial studied in mathematics, in particular in algebraic graph theory and algebraic combinatorics. The order polynomial counts the number of order-preserving maps from a poset to a chain of length $n$. These order-preserving maps were first introduced by Richard P. Stanley while studying ordered structures and partitions as a Ph.D. student at Harvard University in 1971 under the guidance of Gian-Carlo Rota.

== Definition ==
Let $P$ be a finite poset with $p$ elements denoted $x,y \in P$, and let $[n]=\{1<2<\ldots<n\}$ be a chain with $n$ elements. A map $\phi: P \to [n]$ is order-preserving if $x \leq y$ implies $\phi(x) \leq \phi(y)$. The number of such maps grows polynomially with $n$, and the function that counts their number is the order polynomial $\Omega(n)=\Omega(P,n)$.

Similarly, we can define an order polynomial that counts the number of strictly order-preserving maps $\phi: P \to [n]$, meaning $x < y$ implies $\phi(x) < \phi(y)$. The number of such maps is the strict order polynomial $\Omega^{\circ}\! (n)=\Omega^{\circ}\! (P,n)$.

Both $\Omega(n)$ and $\Omega^\circ\!(n)$ have degree $p$. The order-preserving maps generalize the linear extensions of $P$, the order-preserving bijections $\phi:P\stackrel{\sim}{\longrightarrow}[p]$. In fact, the leading coefficient of $\Omega(n)$ and $\Omega^\circ\!(n)$ is the number of linear extensions divided by $p!$.

== Examples ==
Letting $P$ be a chain of $p$ elements, we have

$\Omega(n) = \binom{n+p-1}{p} = \left(\!\left({n\atop p}\right)\!\right)$ and $\Omega^\circ(n) = \binom{n}{p}.$

There is only one linear extension (the identity mapping), and both polynomials have leading term $\tfrac 1{p!}n^p$.

Letting $P$ be an antichain of $p$ incomparable elements, we have $\Omega(n) =\Omega^\circ(n) = n^p$. Since any bijection $\phi:P\stackrel{\sim}{\longrightarrow}[p]$ is (strictly) order-preserving, there are $p!$ linear extensions, and both polynomials reduce to the leading term $\tfrac {p!}{p!}n^p = n^p$.

== Reciprocity theorem ==
There is a relation between strictly order-preserving maps and order-preserving maps:

$$\Omega^\circ(n) = (-1)^{|P|}\Omega(-n).$$

In the case that $P$ is a chain, this recovers the negative binomial identity. There are similar results for the chromatic polynomial and Ehrhart polynomial (see below), all special cases of Stanley's general Reciprocity Theorem.

== Connections with other counting polynomials ==
=== Chromatic polynomial ===
The chromatic polynomial $P(G,n)$counts the number of proper colorings of a finite graph $G$ with $n$ available colors. For an acyclic orientation $\sigma$ of the edges of $G$, there is a natural "downstream" partial order on the vertices $V(G)$ implied by the basic relations $u > v$ whenever $u \rightarrow v$ is a directed edge of $\sigma$. (Thus, the Hasse diagram of the poset is a subgraph of the oriented graph $\sigma$.) We say $\phi: V(G) \rightarrow [n]$ is compatible with $\sigma$ if $\phi$ is order-preserving. Then we have

$$P(G,n) \ =\ \sum_{\sigma} \Omega^\circ\!(\sigma,n),$$

where $\sigma$ runs over all acyclic orientations of G, considered as poset structures.

=== Order polytope and Ehrhart polynomial ===
The order polytope associates a polytope with a partial order. For a poset $P$ with $p$ elements, the order polytope $O(P)$ is the set of order-preserving maps $f:P\to [0,1]$, where $[0,1] = \{ t\in\mathbb{R}\mid 0\leq t\leq 1\}$ is the ordered unit interval, a continuous chain poset. More geometrically, we may list the elements $P=\{x_1,\ldots,x_p\}$, and identify any mapping $f:P\to\mathbb R$ with the point $(f(x_1),\ldots,f(x_p))\in \mathbb{R}^{p}$; then the order polytope is the set of points $(t_1,\ldots,t_p)\in [0,1]^p$ with $t_i \leq t_j$ if $x_i \leq x_j$.

The Ehrhart polynomial counts the number of integer lattice points inside the dilations of a polytope. Specifically, consider the lattice $L=\mathbb{Z}^n$ and a $d$-dimensional polytope $K\subset\mathbb{R}^d$ with vertices in $L$; then we define

$$L(K,n) = \#(nK \cap L),$$

the number of lattice points in $nK$, the dilation of $K$ by a positive integer scalar $n$. Ehrhart showed that this is a rational polynomial of degree $d$ in the variable $n$, provided $K$ has vertices in the lattice.

In fact, the Ehrhart polynomial of an order polytope is equal to the order polynomial of the original poset (with a shifted argument):

$L(O(P),n)\ =\ \Omega(P,n{+}1).$

This is an immediate consequence of the definitions, considering the embedding of the $(n{+}1)$-chain poset $[n{+}1]=\{0<1<\cdots<n\}\subset \mathbb{R}$.
