= Z-polyhedron =

Z-polyhedron or Z-polytope may refer to:

- The set of integer points in convex polyhedron
- Convex lattice polytope
