= Deltoid curve =

Roulette curve made from circles with radii that differ by factors of 3 or 1.5

Fixed outer circle Rolling circle (1/3 the radius of the outer circle) Deltoid curve formed by tracing a circumferential point on the rolling circle

In geometry, a deltoid curve, also known as a tricuspoid curve or Steiner curve, is a hypocycloid of three cusps. In other words, it is the roulette (type of curve) created by a point on the circumference of a circle as it rolls without slipping along the inside of a circle with three or one-and-a-half times its radius. It is named after the capital Greek letter delta (Δ) which it resembles.

More broadly, a deltoid can refer to any closed figure with three vertices connected by curves that are concave to the exterior, making the interior points a non-convex set.

== Construction ==
=== Equations ===
A hypocycloid can be represented (up to rotation and translation) by the following parametric equations

$$x=(b-a)\cos(t)+a\cos\left(\frac{b-a}at\right) \,$$
$$y=(b-a)\sin(t)-a\sin\left(\frac{b-a}at\right) \, ,$$

where a is the radius of the rolling circle, b is the radius of the circle within which the aforementioned circle is rolling and t ranges from zero to 6π. (In the illustration above b = 3a tracing the deltoid.)

In complex coordinates this becomes

$$z=2ae^{it}+ae^{-2it}$$.

The variable t can be eliminated from these equations to give the Cartesian equation

$$(x^2+y^2)^2+18a^2(x^2+y^2)-27a^4 = 8a(x^3-3xy^2),\,$$

so the deltoid is a plane algebraic curve of degree four. In polar coordinates this becomes

$$r^4+18a^2r^2-27a^4=8ar^3\cos 3\theta\,.$$

The curve has three singularities, cusps corresponding to $t=0,\, \pm\tfrac{2\pi}{3}$. The parameterization above implies that the curve is rational which implies it has genus zero.

A line segment can slide with each end on the deltoid and remain tangent to the deltoid. The point of tangency travels around the deltoid twice while each end travels around it once.

The dual curve of the deltoid is

$$x^3-x^2-(3x+1)y^2=0,\,$$

which has a double point at the origin which can be made visible for plotting by an imaginary rotation y ↦ iy, giving the curve

$$x^3-x^2+(3x+1)y^2=0\,$$

with a double point at the origin of the real plane.

== Area and perimeter ==
The area of the deltoid is $2\pi a^2$ where again a is the radius of the rolling circle; thus the area of the deltoid is twice that of the rolling circle.

The perimeter (total arc length) of the deltoid is 16a.

The incircle of the deltoid has radius R/2, this means 3/2 a.

== History ==
Ordinary cycloids were studied by Galileo Galilei and Marin Mersenne as early as 1599 but cycloidal curves were first conceived by Ole Rømer in 1674 while studying the best form for gear teeth. Leonhard Euler claims first consideration of the actual deltoid in 1745 in connection with an optical problem.

== Applications ==
Deltoids arise in several fields of mathematics. For instance:

- The set of complex eigenvalues of unistochastic matrices of order three forms a deltoid.
- A cross-section of the set of unistochastic matrices of order three forms a deltoid.
- The set of possible traces of unitary matrices belonging to the group SU(3) forms a deltoid.
- The intersection of two deltoids parametrizes a family of complex Hadamard matrices of order six.
- The set of all Simson lines of given triangle, form an envelope in the shape of a deltoid. This is known as the Steiner deltoid or Steiner's hypocycloid after Jakob Steiner who described the shape and symmetry of the curve in 1856.
- The envelope of the area bisectors of a triangle is a deltoid (in the broader sense defined above) with vertices at the midpoints of the medians. The sides of the deltoid are arcs of hyperbolas that are asymptotic to the triangle's sides.
- A deltoid was proposed as a solution to the Kakeya needle problem.

== See also ==
- Astroid, a curve with four cusps
- Circular horn triangle, a three-cusped curve formed from circular arcs
- Ideal triangle, a three-cusped curve formed from hyperbolic lines
- Kite (geometry), also called a deltoid
- Pseudotriangle, a three-pointed region between three tangent convex sets
- Tusi couple, a two-cusped roulette
