= Reeve tetrahedra =

Family of tetrahedra on an integer lattice

The Reeve tetrahedra for r = 1, 2, 3 have the same number of interior (i) and boundary (b) lattice points but different volumes (V).

Reeve tetrahedra for different choices of the parameter r

In geometry, the Reeve tetrahedra are a family of polyhedra with vertices at
$$\begin{array}{lcl}
(0, & 0, & 0), \\
(1, & 0, & 0), \\
(0, & 1, & 0), \\
(1, & 1, & r),
\end{array}$$
where r is a positive integer. They are named after John Reeve, who in 1957 used them to show that higher-dimensional generalizations of Pick's theorem do not exist. Despite this negative result, Reeve developed an alternative formula for calculating the volume of lattice polyhedra in three dimensions that involves counting lattice points from finer lattices and incorporating the Euler characteristic of the polyhedron.

== Counterexample to generalizations of Pick's theorem ==
All vertices of a Reeve tetrahedron are integer lattice points (points whose coordinates are all integers). No other lattice points lie on the surface or in the interior of the tetrahedron. The volume of the Reeve tetrahedron with vertex (1, 1, r) is r/6. In 1957 Reeve used this tetrahedron to show that there exist tetrahedra with four lattice points as vertices, and containing no other lattice points, but with arbitrarily large volume.

In two dimensions, the area of every polyhedron with lattice vertices is determined as a formula of the number of lattice points on its boundary and in its interior, according to Pick's theorem. The Reeve tetrahedra imply that there can be no corresponding formula for the volume in three or more dimensions. Any such formula would be unable to distinguish the Reeve tetrahedra with different choices of r from each other, but their volumes are all different.

== Reeve's formula for lattice polyhedra ==
Despite the negative result regarding a direct generalization of Pick's theorem, Reeve developed a more sophisticated formula for the volume of three-dimensional lattice polyhedra. His approach involved introducing additional "rational lattices", defined for each positive integer $n$ as
$$Z_n = \{x \in \mathbb{R}^3 : nx \in \mathbb{Z}^3\}.$$

For a lattice polyhedron P in $\mathbb{R}^3$, let $I_n$ and $B_n$ denote the number of points from the lattice $Z_n$ in the interior and on the boundary of P, respectively. Reeve's formula for the volume is:
$$12V(P) = 2I_2 + B_2 - 2(2I_1 + B_1) + 2\chi(P) - \chi(\partial P),$$
where $\chi(P)$ is the Euler characteristic of P and $\chi(\partial P)$ is the Euler characteristic of the boundary of P.

For lattice polyhedra that are 3-dimensional manifolds, the formula simplifies to:
$$12V(P) = 2I_2 + B_2 - 2(2I_1 + B_1).$$
This formula demonstrates that while a simple analogue of Pick's theorem doesn't exist in higher dimensions, volume can still be calculated using a combination of lattice points from different lattices and topological invariants.

== Ehrhart polynomial ==
The Ehrhart polynomial of a given integral polytope $P$ in $\mathbb{R}^n$ counts the number of integer lattice points that it contains when scaled up by an integer factor. The Ehrhart polynomial has the form

$$G_n(P) = V(P)n^N + a_{N-1}(P)n^{N-1} + \cdots + a_1(P)n + \chi(P)$$

where $V(P)$ is the volume of $P$, the coefficients $a_{N-1}(P), \ldots, a_1(P)$ are rational numbers, and $\chi(P)$ is the Euler characteristic of $P$.

The Ehrhart polynomial of the Reeve tetrahedron T_{r} of height r is

$$L(\mathcal{T}_r, t) = \frac{r}{6}t^3 + t^2 + \left(2 - \frac{r}{6}\right)t + 1.$$

Thus, for r ≥ 13, the coefficient of t in the Ehrhart polynomial of T_{r} is negative. This example shows that Ehrhart polynomials can sometimes have negative coefficients.

Ehrhart polynomials satisfy a reciprocity law that relates the number of interior lattice points to the evaluation of the polynomial at negative integers. For lattice polyhedra that are N-dimensional manifolds, this reciprocity law is crucial in deriving volume formulas like Reeve's.
