= Unistochastic matrix =

In mathematics, a unistochastic matrix (also called unitary-stochastic) is a doubly stochastic matrix whose entries are the squares of the absolute values of the entries of some unitary matrix.

A square matrix B of size n is doubly stochastic (or bistochastic) if all its entries are non-negative real numbers and each of its rows and columns sum to 1. It is unistochastic if there exists a unitary matrix U such that

$$B_{ij}=|U_{ij}|^2 \text{ for } i,j=1,\dots,n. \,$$

This definition is analogous to that for an orthostochastic matrix, which is a doubly stochastic matrix whose entries are the squares of the entries in some orthogonal matrix. Since all orthogonal matrices are necessarily unitary matrices, all orthostochastic matrices are also unistochastic. The converse, however, is not true. First, all 2-by-2 doubly stochastic matrices are both unistochastic and orthostochastic, but for larger n this is not the case. For example, take $n=3$ and consider the following doubly stochastic matrix:

$$B= \frac{1}{2}
\begin{bmatrix}
1  & 1 & 0  \\
0  & 1 & 1  \\
1  & 0 & 1   \end{bmatrix}.$$

This matrix is not unistochastic, since any two vectors with moduli equal to the square root of the entries of two columns (or rows) of B cannot be made orthogonal by a suitable choice of phases. For $n > 2$, the set of orthostochastic matrices is a proper subset of the set of unistochastic matrices.

- the set of unistochastic matrices contains all permutation matrices and its convex hull is the Birkhoff polytope of all doubly stochastic matrices
- for $n \ge 3$ this set is not convex
- for $n = 3$ the set of triangle inequality on the moduli of the raw is a sufficient and necessary condition for the unistocasticity
- for $n =3$ the set of unistochastic matrices is star--shaped and unistochasticity of any bistochastic matrix B is implied by a non-negative value of its Jarlskog invariant
- for $n =3$ the relative volume of the set of unistochastic matrices with respect to the Birkhoff polytope of doubly stochastic matrices is $8\pi^2/105 \approx 75.2 \%$
- for $n =4$ explicit conditions for unistochasticity are not known yet, but there exists a numerical method to verify unistochasticity based on the algorithm by Haagerup
- The Schur-Horn theorem is equivalent to the following "weak convexity" property of the set $\mathcal{U}_n$ of unistochastic $n \times n$ matrices: for any vector $v \in \mathbb{R}^n$ the set $\mathcal{U}_nv$ is the convex hull of the set of vectors obtained by all permutations of the entries of the vector $v$ (the permutation polytope generated by the vector $v$).
- The set of $n \times n$ unistochastic matrices $\mathcal{U}_n \subset \mathbb{R}^{(n-1)^2}$ has a nonempty interior. The unistochastic matrix corresponding to the unitary $n \times n$ matrix with the entries $U_{ij} = \delta_{ij} + \frac{\theta-1}{n}$, where $|\theta|=1$ and $\theta \neq \pm 1$, is an interior point of $\mathcal{U}_n$.
