= Quasi-polynomial =

Generalization of polynomials

In mathematics, a quasi-polynomial (sometimes called pseudo-polynomial) is a generalization of polynomials. While the coefficients of a polynomial come from a ring, the coefficients of quasi-polynomials are instead periodic functions with integral period. Quasi-polynomials appear throughout much of combinatorics as the enumerators for various objects.

== Definition ==
A quasi-polynomial is a function $q$ defined on $\mathbb{Z}$ of the form $q(n) = c_d(n) n^d + c_{d-1}(n) n^{d-1} + \cdots + c_0(n)$, where each $c_i(n)$ is a periodic function with integral period. If $c_d(n)$ is not identically zero, then the degree of $q$ is $d$, and any common period of $c_0(n), c_1(n), \dots, c_d(n)$ is a period of $q$. The minimal such period (sometimes simply called the period or the quasi-period of $q$) is the least common multiple of the periods of $c_0(n), c_1(n), \dots, c_d(n)$.

Equivalently, a function $q$ defined on $\mathbb{Z}$ is a quasi-polynomial if there exist a positive integer $s$ and polynomials $p_0, \dots, p_{s-1}$ such that $q(n) = p_i(n)$ when $i \equiv n \bmod s$. The minimal such $s$ coincides with the minimal period of $q$. The polynomials $p_i$ are called the constituents of $q$.

== Generating functions ==
A function $q$ defined on $\mathbb{Z}$ is a quasi-polynomial of degree $\le d$ and period dividing $r$ if and only its generating function

$$Q(x) := \sum_{ n \ge 0 } q(n) x^n$$

evaluates to a rational function of the form $Q(x) = \frac{ h(x) }{ (1-x^r)^{ d+1 } }$ where $h(x)$ is a polynomial of degree $< r(d+1)$. Thus quasi-polynomials are characterized through generating functions that are rational and whose poles are rational roots of unity.

== Examples ==
- Given a $d$-dimensional convex polytope $P$ with rational vertices $v_1,\dots,v_n$, define $tP$ to be the convex hull of $tv_1,\dots,tv_n$. The function $L(P,t) = \#(tP \cap \mathbb{Z}^d)$ is a quasi-polynomial in $t$ (viewed as a positive integer variable) of degree $d$; the minimal positive integer $r$ such that $r P$ has integer vertices is a period of $L(P,t)$. This is known as the Ehrhart quasi-polynomial, named after Eugène Ehrhart.
- Given two quasi-polynomials $F$ and $G$, the convolution of $F$ and $G$ is

$$(F*G)(k) = \sum_{m=0}^k F(m)G(k-m)$$

which is a quasi-polynomial with degree $\le \deg F + \deg G + 1.$
