= Birkhoff polytope =

Polytope

The Birkhoff polytope $B_n$ is the convex polytope in $\R^{n^2}$ whose points are the doubly stochastic matrices, that is, the $n\times n$ matrices whose entries are non-negative real numbers and whose rows and columns each add up to 1. It is named after Garrett Birkhoff, and also called the assignment polytope, the polytope of doubly stochastic matrices, or the perfect matching polytope of the complete bipartite graph $K_{n,n}$.

== Properties ==
=== Vertices ===
The Birkhoff polytope has $n!$ vertices, one for each permutation on $n$ items. This follows from the Birkhoff–von Neumann theorem, which states that the extreme points of the Birkhoff polytope are the permutation matrices, and therefore that any doubly stochastic matrix may be represented as a convex combination of permutation matrices; this was stated in a 1946 paper by Garrett Birkhoff, but equivalent results in the languages of projective configurations and of regular bipartite graph matchings, respectively, were shown much earlier in 1894 in Ernst Steinitz's thesis and in 1916 by Dénes Kőnig. Because all of the vertex coordinates are zero or one, the Birkhoff polytope is an integral polytope.

=== Edges ===
The edges of the Birkhoff polytope correspond to pairs of permutations differing by a cycle:

$(\sigma,\omega)$ such that $\sigma^{-1}\omega$ is a cycle.

This implies that the graph of $B_n$ is a Cayley graph of the symmetric group $S_n$. This also implies that the graph of $B_3$ is a complete graph $K_6$, and thus $B_3$ is a neighborly polytope.

=== Facets ===
The Birkhoff polytope lies within an $(n^2-2n+1)$-dimensional affine subspace of the $n^2$-dimensional space of all $n\times n$ matrices. This subspace is determined by the linear equality constraints that the sum of each row and of each column must equal one. Within this subspace, it is defined by $n^2$ linear inequalities, one for each coordinate of the matrix, specifying that the coordinate must be non-negative. Therefore, for $n\ge 3$, it has exactly $n^2$ facets. For $n=2$, there are two facets, given by $a_{11}=a_{22}=0$, and $a_{12}=a_{21}=0$.

=== Symmetries ===
The Birkhoff polytope $B_n$ is both vertex-transitive and facet-transitive (i.e. the dual polytope is vertex-transitive). It is not regular for $n > 2$.

=== Volume ===
An outstanding problem is to find the volume of the Birkhoff polytopes. This has been done for $n\le 10$. It is known to be equal to the volume of a polytope associated with standard Young tableaux. A combinatorial formula for all $n$ was given in 2007. The following asymptotic formula was found by Rodney Canfield and Brendan McKay:

$$\mathop{\mathrm{vol}}(B_n) \, = \, \exp\left( - (n-1)^2\ln n + n^2 - \left(n - \frac{1}{2}\right)\ln(2\pi) + \frac{1}{3} + o(1) \right) .$$

For small values $n\le 15$ the volume was estimated in 2014 while similar estimations follow.

=== Ehrhart polynomial ===
Determining the Ehrhart polynomial of a polytope is harder than determining its volume, since the volume can easily be computed from the leading coefficient of the Ehrhart polynomial. The Ehrhart polynomial associated with the Birkhoff polytope is only known for small values. It is conjectured that all the coefficients of the Ehrhart polynomials are non-negative.

== Generalizations ==
- The Birkhoff polytope is a special case of the transportation polytope, a polytope of nonnegative rectangular matrices with given row and column sums. The integer points in these polytopes are called contingency tables; they play an important role in Bayesian statistics.
- The Birkhoff polytope is a special case of the matching polytope, defined as a convex hull of the perfect matchings in a finite graph. The description of facets in this generality was given by Jack Edmonds (1965), and is related to Edmonds's matching algorithm.
- The Birkhoff polytope is a special case of the flow polytope of nonnegative flows through a network. It is related to the Ford–Fulkerson algorithm that computes the maximum flow in a flow network.

== See also ==
- Birkhoff algorithm
- Permutohedron
- Stable matching polytope
