= Critical pair =

In mathematics, a critical pair may refer to:

- Critical pair (term rewriting), terms resulting from two overlapping rules in a term rewriting system
- Critical pair (order theory), two incomparable elements of a partial order that could be made comparable without changing any other relation in the partial order
- The pair of polynomials associated with an S-polynomial in Buchberger's algorithm for computing a Gröbner basis
