= Orthostochastic matrix =

Doubly stochastic matrix

In mathematics, an orthostochastic matrix is a doubly stochastic matrix whose entries are the squares of the absolute values of the entries of some orthogonal matrix.

The detailed definition is as follows. A square matrix B of size n is doubly stochastic (or bistochastic) if all its rows and columns sum to 1 and all its entries are nonnegative real numbers. It is orthostochastic if there exists an orthogonal matrix O such that

$$B_{ij}=O_{ij}^2 \text{ for } i,j=1,\dots,n. \,$$

All 2-by-2 doubly stochastic matrices are orthostochastic (and also unistochastic) since for any

$$B= \begin{bmatrix}
a & 1-a \\
1-a & a \end{bmatrix}$$

we find the corresponding orthogonal matrix

$$O = \begin{bmatrix}
\cos \phi &  \sin \phi \\
- \sin \phi & \cos \phi \end{bmatrix},$$

with $\cos^2 \phi =a,$ such that $B_{ij}=O_{ij}^2 .$

For larger n the sets of bistochastic matrices includes the set of unistochastic matrices, which includes the set of orthostochastic matrices and these inclusion relations are proper.

The set of all orthostochastic matrices of size n, denoted by $\mathcal{O}_n$, is a true subset of the Birkhoff polytope $B_n$ .
