= Pick's theorem =

Formula for area of a grid polygon

Farey sunburst of order 6, with 1 interior (red) and 96 boundary (green) points giving an area of 1 + 96/2 − 1 = 48

In geometry, Pick's theorem provides a formula for the area of a simple polygon with integer vertex coordinates, in terms of the number of integer points within it and on its boundary. The result was first described by Georg Alexander Pick in 1899. It was popularized in English by Hugo Steinhaus in the 1950 edition of his book Mathematical Snapshots. It has multiple proofs, and can be generalized to formulas for certain kinds of non-simple polygons.

== Formula ==
i = 7, b = 8, A = i + b/2 − 1 = 10

Suppose that a polygon has integer coordinates for all of its vertices. Let $i$ be the number of integer points interior to the polygon, and let $b$ be the number of integer points on its boundary (including both vertices and points along the sides). Then the area $A$ of this polygon is:
$$A = i + \frac{b}{2} - 1.$$
The example shown has $i=7$ interior points and $b=8$ boundary points, so its area is $A=7+\tfrac{8}{2}-1=10$ square units.

== Proofs ==
=== Via Euler's formula ===
One proof of this theorem involves subdividing the polygon into triangles with three integer vertices and no other integer points. One can then prove that each subdivided triangle has area exactly $\tfrac{1}{2}$. Therefore, the area of the whole polygon equals half the number of triangles in the subdivision. After relating area to the number of triangles in this way, the proof concludes by using Euler's polyhedral formula to relate the number of triangles to the number of grid points in the polygon.

Tiling of the plane by copies of a triangle with three integer vertices and no other integer points, as used in the proof of Pick's theorem

The first part of this proof shows that a triangle with three integer vertices and no other integer points has area exactly $\tfrac{1}{2}$, as Pick's formula states. The proof uses the fact that all triangles tile the plane, with adjacent triangles rotated by 180° from each other around their shared edge. For tilings by a triangle with three integer vertices and no other integer points, each point of the integer grid is a vertex of six tiles. Because the number of triangles per grid point (six) is twice the number of grid points per triangle (three), the triangles are twice as dense in the plane as the grid points. Any scaled region of the plane contains twice as many triangles (in the limit as the scale factor goes to infinity) as the number of grid points it contains. Therefore, each triangle has area $\tfrac{1}{2}$, as needed for the proof.

Convex parallelogram centered at one interior integer point, constructed from an integer triangle.

An alternative proof that these triangles have area $\tfrac{1}{2}$ uses Minkowski's theorem that a symmetric convex set centered at a grid point and with no other interior grid point has area $\le 4$. Applying it to a parallelogram constructed from eight copies of a given triangle shows that the triangle's area is at most $\tfrac{1}{2}$. But by the shoelace formula, the area of such a triangle is a positive half-integer, so the area must equal $\tfrac{1}{2}$.

Subdivision of a grid polygon into special triangles

This already proves Pick's formula for a polygon that is one of these special triangles. Any other polygon can be subdivided into special triangles: add non-crossing line segments within the polygon between pairs of grid points until no more line segments can be added. The only polygons that cannot be subdivided in this way are the special triangles considered above; therefore, only special triangles can appear in the resulting subdivision. Because each special triangle has area $\tfrac{1}{2}$, a polygon of area $A$ will be subdivided into $2A$ special triangles.

The subdivision of the polygon into triangles forms a planar graph, and Euler's formula $V-E+F=2$ gives an equation that applies to the number of vertices, edges, and faces of any planar graph. The vertices are just the grid points of the polygon; there are $V=i+b$ of them. The faces are the triangles of the subdivision, and the single region of the plane outside of the polygon. The number of triangles is $2A$, so altogether there are $F=2A+1$ faces. To count the edges, observe that there are $6A$ sides of triangles in the subdivision. Each edge interior to the polygon is the side of two triangles. However, there are $b$ edges of triangles that lie along the polygon's boundary and form part of only one triangle. Therefore, the number of sides of triangles obeys the equation $6A=2E-b$, from which one can solve for the number of edges, $E=\tfrac{6A+b}{2}$. Plugging these values for $V$, $E$, and $F$ into Euler's formula $V-E+F=2$ gives
$$(i+b) - \frac{6A+b}{2} + (2A+1) = 2.$$
Pick's formula is obtained by solving this linear equation for $A$. An alternative but similar calculation involves proving that the number of edges of the same subdivision is $E=3i+2b-3$, leading to the same result.

It is also possible to go the other direction, using Pick's theorem (proved in a different way) as the basis for a proof of Euler's formula.

=== Other proofs ===
Alternative proofs of Pick's theorem that do not use Euler's formula include the following.

- One can recursively decompose the given polygon into triangles, allowing some triangles of the subdivision to have area larger than 1/2. Both the area and the counts of points used in Pick's formula add together in the same way as each other, so the truth of Pick's formula for general polygons follows from its truth for triangles. Any triangle subdivides its bounding box into the triangle itself and additional right triangles, and the areas of both the bounding box and the right triangles are easy to compute. Combining these area computations gives Pick's formula for triangles, and combining triangles gives Pick's formula for arbitrary polygons.
- Alternatively, instead of using grid squares centered on the grid points, it is possible to use grid squares having their vertices at the grid points. These grid squares cut the given polygon into pieces, which can be rearranged (by matching up pairs of squares along each edge of the polygon) into a polyomino with the same area.
- Pick's theorem may also be proved based on complex integration of a doubly periodic function related to Weierstrass elliptic functions.
- Applying the Poisson summation formula to the characteristic function of the polygon leads to another proof.

Pick's theorem was included in a 1999 web listing of the "top 100 mathematical theorems", which later became used by Freek Wiedijk as a benchmark set to test the power of different proof assistants. As of 2024, Pick's theorem had been formalized and proven in only two of the ten proof assistants recorded by Wiedijk.

== Generalizations ==
i = 2, b = 12, h = 1, A = i + b/2 + h − 1 = 8

Generalizations to Pick's theorem to non-simple polygons are more complicated and require more information than just the number of interior and boundary vertices. For instance, a polygon with h holes bounded by simple integer polygons, disjoint from each other and from the boundary, has area
$$A = i + \frac{b}{2} + h - 1.$$

It is also possible to generalize Pick's theorem to regions bounded by more complex planar straight-line graphs with integer vertex coordinates, using additional terms defined using the Euler characteristic of the region and its boundary, or to polygons with a single boundary polygon that can cross itself, using a formula involving the winding number of the polygon around each integer point as well as its total winding number.

Reeve tetrahedra showing that Pick's theorem does not apply in higher dimensions

The Reeve tetrahedra in three dimensions have four integer points as vertices and contain no other integer points, but do not all have the same volume. Therefore, there does not exist an analogue of Pick's theorem in three dimensions that expresses the volume of a polyhedron as a function only of its numbers of interior and boundary points. However, these volumes can instead be expressed using Ehrhart polynomials.

== Related topics ==
Several other mathematical topics relate the areas of regions to the numbers of grid points. Blichfeldt's theorem states that every shape can be translated to contain at least its area in grid points. The Gauss circle problem concerns bounding the error between the areas and numbers of grid points in circles. The problem of counting integer points in convex polyhedra arises in several areas of mathematics and computer science. In application areas, the dot planimeter is a transparency-based device for estimating the area of a shape by counting the grid points that it contains. The Farey sequence is an ordered sequence of rational numbers with bounded denominators whose analysis involves Pick's theorem.

Another simple method for calculating the area of a polygon is the shoelace formula. It gives the area of any simple polygon as a sum of terms computed from the coordinates of consecutive pairs of its vertices. Unlike Pick's theorem, the shoelace formula does not require the vertices to have integer coordinates.
