= Distributive polytope =

In the geometry of convex polytopes, a distributive polytope is a convex polytope for which coordinatewise minima and maxima of pairs of points remain within the polytope. For example, this property is true of the unit cube, so the unit cube is a distributive polytope. It is called a distributive polytope because the coordinatewise minimum and coordinatewise maximum operations form the meet and join operations of a continuous distributive lattice on the points of the polytope.

Every face of a distributive polytope is itself a distributive polytope. The distributive polytopes all of whose vertex coordinates are 0 or 1 are exactly the order polytopes.

== See also ==
- Stable matching polytope, a convex polytope that defines a distributive lattice on its points in a different way
