= Ehrhart's volume conjecture =

Upper bound on the volume of a convex body containing one lattice point

A standard simplex in $n = 2$ dimensions, scaled by $n+1 = 3$, with $(1, 1)$ at its barycenter. Equality is achieved, with the area being $(n+1)^n/n! = 9/2$

In the geometry of numbers, Ehrhart's volume conjecture gives an upper bound on the volume of a convex body containing only one lattice point in its interior. It is a kind of converse to Minkowski's theorem, which guarantees that a centrally symmetric convex body $K$ must contain a lattice point as soon as its volume exceeds $2^n$. The conjecture states that a convex body $K$ containing only one lattice point in its interior as its barycenter cannot have volume greater than $(n+1)^n/n!$:

$$\operatorname{Vol}(K) \le \frac{(n+1)^n}{n!}.$$

Equality is achieved in this inequality when $K=(n+1)\Delta_n$ is a copy of the standard simplex in Euclidean $n$-dimensional space, whose sides are scaled up by a factor of $n+1$. Equivalently, $K=(n+1)\Delta_n$ is congruent to the convex hull of the vectors $-\sum_{i=1}^n \mathbf{e}_i$, and $(n+1)\mathbf{e}_j - \sum_{i=1}^n \mathbf{e}_i$ for all $j=1,\ldots,n$. Presented in this manner, the origin is the only lattice point interior to the convex body $K$.

The conjecture, furthermore, asserts that equality is achieved in the above inequality if and only if $K$ is unimodularly equivalent to $(n+1)\Delta_n$.

== History and resolution ==
Eugene Ehrhart proved the conjecture in dimension 2 and in the special case of simplices in arbitrary dimensions. For several decades, the general conjecture remained open despite efforts by numerous mathematicians.

In 2014, Benjamin Nill and Andreas Paffenholz confirmed the conjecture for several important classes of rational polytopes, establishing that equality holds if and only if $K$ is unimodularly equivalent to the standard simplex.

In August 2026, OpenAI announced that its Astra reasoning model proved the inequality part of the conjecture, establishing the sharp upper bound $\operatorname{Vol}(K) \le (n+1)^n/n!$, with the proof formally verified in Lean 4.
