= Delzant's theorem =

Classification of symplectic toric manifolds

In differential geometry, a field of mathematics, Delzant's theorem provides a complete classification of symplectic toric manifolds in terms of a special class of polytopes. It was proved by Thomas Delzant in 1988.

== Preliminaries ==
A symplectic toric manifold is a compact connected symplectic manifold $(M^{2n},\omega)$ together with an effective Hamiltonian action of the $n$-dimensional torus $\mathbb{T}^n = \mathbb{S}^1 \times \ldots \times \mathbb{S}^1$ on $M$, with moment map denoted by $\mu: M \to \mathbb{R}^n$.

The convexity theorem, proved independently in 1982 by Atiyah and by Guillemin and Sternberg using Morse theory, states that the image $\mu(M) \subset \mathbb{R}^n$ is the convex hull of the images of the fixed points of the $\mathbb{T}^n$-action. It is therefore a convex polytope, also called the moment polytope.

A Delzant polytope is a special kind of convex polytope in $\mathbb{R}^n$, satisfying the following three properties

- it is a simple polytope, i.e. for each vertex $x$, exactly $n$ edges meet at $x$;
- it is a rational polytope, i.e. for each vertex $x$, the edges at $x$ are of the form $x+tu_i^x$, with $t \geq 0$ and $u_i^x \in \mathbb{Q}$;
- it is smooth polytope, i.e. for each vertex $x$, the corresponding vectors $u_i^x$ form a $\mathbb{Z}$-basis of $\mathbb{Z}^n$.

== Statement ==
Delzant's theorem states that there is a bijective correspondence between $2n$-dimensional symplectic toric manifolds (up to torus-equivariant symplectomorphism) and Delzant polytopes in $\mathbb{R}^n$:
$$\{\text{Toric manifolds}\} \leftrightarrow \{\text{Delzant polytopes}\}, \quad (M^{2n},\omega,\mathbb{T}^n,\mu) \mapsto \mu(M).$$
More precisely, the moment polytope of every symplectic toric manifold is a Delzant polytope, every Delzant polytope is the moment polytope of such a manifold, and any two such manifolds with equivalent moment polytopes (up to translations and $\mathrm{GL}(n,\mathbb{Z})$-transformations) admit a torus-equivariant symplectomorphism between them. The proof of this result is based on symplectic reduction.

== Examples ==
=== Projective spaces ===
The complex projective space $\mathbb{CP}^n$ is a $2n$-dimensional toric manifold together with the Fubini-Study symplectic form, the action by $\mathbb{T}^n = \mathbb{S}^1 \times \ldots \times \mathbb{S}^1$ given by
$$(e^{i \theta_1}, \ldots, e^{i \theta_n}) \cdot [z_0 : z_1 : \ldots : z_n] := [z_0 : e^{i \theta_1} z_1 : \ldots : e^{i \theta_n} z_n ],$$
and the moment map
$$\mu: \mathbb{CP}^n \to \mathbb{R}^n, \quad [z_0: z_1 : \ldots : z_n] \mapsto \frac{(|z_1|^2, \ldots, |z_n|^2)}{|z_0|^2 + |z_1|^2 + \ldots + |z_n|^2} .$$
Its associated Delzant polytope is the standard $n$-simplex in $\mathbb{R}^n$.

In particular, the case $n=1$ can be identified with the $\mathbb{S}^1$-action by rotations on $\mathbb{CP}^1 \cong \mathbb{S}^2$, with moment map given by the height function; its associated Delzant polytope is a segment.

=== Products ===
The Delzant correspondence is compatible with products. For instance, the product $\mathbb{S}^2 \times \mathbb{S}^2$ is a 4-dimensional toric manifold, being the product of two copies of the toric manifold $\mathbb{CP}^1 \cong \mathbb{S}^2$ from above. Its associated Delzant polytope is the product of two segments, i.e. a rectangle in $\mathbb{R}^2$.

=== Other examples ===
Any Hirzebruch surface is a 4-dimensional toric manifold; its associated Delzant polytope is a right-angled trapezium.
