= Stanley's reciprocity theorem =

Gives a functional equation satisfied by the generating function of any rational cone

Stanley's reciprocity theorem, named after the mathematician Richard P. Stanley, states that a certain functional equation is satisfied by the integer-point generating function of a rational cone and the generating function of the cone's interior.

== Definitions ==
A rational cone is a subset of ${\bf R}^d$ consisting of all points satisfying a finite set of homogeneous linear inequalities with integer coefficients or, alternatively, the nonnegative span of a finite set of integer vectors. That is, a rational cone C has the two alternative descriptions

$$C = \left\{ x \in {\bf R}^d : Ax \le 0 \right\}$$

for some $m \times d$ integer matrix A (i.e., C is defined by the m halfspaces given by the rows of A), and

$$C = \left\{ By : y \ge 0 \right\}$$

for some $d \times n$ integer matrix B (i.e., C is defined as the nonnegative span of the n columns of B).

The integer-point generating function (also called integer-point transform) of such a cone C is

$$F_C(x_1,\dots,x_d)=\sum_{(a_1,\dots,a_d)\in C \cap {\bf Z}^d} x_1^{a_1}\cdots x_d^{a_d}.$$

The generating function $F_{{\rm int}(C)}(x_1,\dots,x_d)$ of the interior of the cone is defined analogously. It can be shown that these generating functions evaluate to rational functions.

== The Reciprocity Theorem ==
Stanley's reciprocity theorem states that for a $d$-dimensional rational cone $C$, we have the following identity of rational functions:

$$F_C(1/x_1,\dots,1/x_d)=(-1)^d F_{{\rm int}(C)}(x_1,\dots,x_d).$$

Stanley's reciprocity theorem generalizes Ehrhart-Macdonald reciprocity for Ehrhart polynomials of rational convex polytopes. Both of these results are examples of combinatorial reciprocity theorems, a term that was, in fact, also coined by Stanley.

== See also ==
- Ehrhart polynomial
