= Doubly stochastic matrix =

Type of square matrix

In mathematics, especially in probability and combinatorics, a doubly stochastic matrix (also called bistochastic matrix) is a square matrix $X=(x_{ij})$ of nonnegative real numbers, each of whose rows and columns sums to 1, i.e.,

$$\sum_i x_{ij}=\sum_j x_{ij}=1,$$

Thus, a doubly stochastic matrix is both left stochastic and right stochastic.

Indeed, any matrix that is both left and right stochastic must be square: if every row sums to 1 then the sum of all entries in the matrix must be equal to the number of rows, and since the same holds for columns, the number of rows and columns must be equal.

== Birkhoff polytope ==
The class of $n\times n$ doubly stochastic matrices is a convex polytope known as the Birkhoff polytope $B_n$. Using the matrix entries as Cartesian coordinates, it lies in an $(n-1)^2$-dimensional affine subspace of $n^2$-dimensional Euclidean space defined by $2n-1$ independent linear constraints specifying that the row and column sums all equal 1. (There are $2n-1$ constraints rather than $2n$ because one of these constraints is dependent, as the sum of the row sums must equal the sum of the column sums.) Moreover, the entries are all constrained to be non-negative and less than or equal to 1.

== Birkhoff–von Neumann theorem ==
The Birkhoff–von Neumann theorem (often known simply as Birkhoff's theorem) states that the polytope $B_n$ is the convex hull of the set of $n\times n$ permutation matrices, and furthermore that the vertices of $B_n$ are precisely the permutation matrices. In other words, if $X$ is a doubly stochastic matrix, then there exist $\theta_1,\ldots,\theta_k \ge 0, \sum_{i=1}^k \theta_i = 1$ and permutation matrices $P_1,\ldots,P_k$ such that

$$X = \theta_1 P_1 + \cdots + \theta_k P_k.$$

(Such a decomposition of X is known as a 'convex combination'.) A proof of the theorem based on Hall's marriage theorem is given below.

This representation is known as the Birkhoff–von Neumann decomposition, and may not be unique. It is often described as a real-valued generalization of Kőnig's theorem, where the correspondence is established through adjacency matrices of graphs.

== Properties ==
- The product of two doubly stochastic matrices is doubly stochastic. However, the inverse of a nonsingular doubly stochastic matrix need not be doubly stochastic (indeed, the inverse is doubly stochastic if it has nonnegative entries).
- The stationary distribution of an irreducible aperiodic finite Markov chain is uniform if and only if its transition matrix is doubly stochastic.
- Sinkhorn's theorem states that any matrix with strictly positive entries can be made doubly stochastic by pre- and post-multiplication by diagonal matrices.
- For $n=2$, all bistochastic matrices are unistochastic and orthostochastic, but for larger $n$ this is not the case.
- Van der Waerden's conjecture that the minimum permanent among all n × n doubly stochastic matrices is $n!/n^n$, achieved by the matrix for which all entries are equal to $1/n$. Proofs of this conjecture were published in 1980 by B. Gyires and in 1981 by G. P. Egorychev and D. I. Falikman; for this work, Egorychev and Falikman won the Fulkerson Prize in 1982.

== Proof of the Birkhoff–von Neumann theorem ==
Let X be a doubly stochastic matrix. Then we will show that there exists a permutation matrix P such that x_{ij} ≠ 0 whenever p_{ij} ≠ 0. Thus if we let λ be the smallest x_{ij} corresponding to a non-zero p_{ij}, the difference X – λP will be a scalar multiple of a doubly stochastic matrix and will have at least one more zero cell than X. Accordingly we may successively reduce the number of non-zero cells in X by removing scalar multiples of permutation matrices until we arrive at the zero matrix, at which point we will have constructed a convex combination of permutation matrices equal to the original X.

For instance if
$$X=\frac{1}{12}\begin{pmatrix} 7 & 0 & 5 \\ 2 & 6 & 4 \\ 3 & 6 & 3 \end{pmatrix}$$
then
$$P=\begin{pmatrix} 0 & 0 & 1 \\ 1 & 0 & 0 \\ 0 & 1 & 0 \end{pmatrix}$$
, $\lambda = \frac{2}{12}$, and
$$X-\lambda P=\frac{1}{12}\begin{pmatrix} 7 & 0 & 3 \\ 0 & 6 & 4 \\ 3 & 4 & 3 \end{pmatrix}$$.

Proof: Construct a bipartite graph in which the rows of X are listed in one part and the columns in the other, and in which row i is connected to column j iff x_{ij} ≠ 0. Let $A$ be any set of rows, and define $A'$ as the set of columns joined to rows in A in the graph. We want to express the sizes $|A|$ and $|A'|$ of the two sets in terms of the x_{ij}.

For every i in A, the sum over j in A' of x_{ij} is 1, since all columns j for which x_{ij} ≠ 0 are included in A', and X is doubly stochastic; hence $|A|$ is the sum over all i ∈ A, j ∈ A' of x_{ij}.

Meanwhile $|A'|$ is the sum over all i (whether or not in A) and all j in A' of x_{ij} ; and this is ≥ the corresponding sum in which the i are limited to rows in A. Hence $|A'|\ge|A|$.

It follows that the conditions of Hall's marriage theorem are satisfied, and that we can therefore find a set of edges in the graph which join each row in X to exactly one (distinct) column. These edges define a permutation matrix whose non-zero cells correspond to non-zero cells in X.

=== Generalisations ===
There is a simple generalisation to matrices with more columns and rows such that the i^{th} row sum is equal to r_{i} (a positive integer), the column sums are equal to 1, and all cells are non-negative (the sum of the row sums being equal to the number of columns). Any matrix in this form can be expressed as a convex combination of matrices in the same form made up of 0s and 1s. The proof is to replace the i^{th} row of the original matrix by r_{i} separate rows, each equal to the original row divided by r_{i} ; to apply Birkhoff's theorem to the resulting square matrix; and at the end to additively recombine the r_{i} rows into a single i^{th} row.

In the same way it is possible to replicate columns as well as rows, but the result of recombination is not necessarily limited to 0s and 1s. A different generalisation (with a significantly harder proof) has been put forward by R. M. Caron et al.

== See also ==
- Stochastic matrix
- Unistochastic matrix
- Birkhoff algorithm
