= Eugène Ehrhart =

French mathematician (1906–2000)

- Born: 1906; Guebwiller
- Died: 2000 (aged 93–94); Strasbourg
- Education: University of Strasbourg
- Known for: Ehrhart polynomial Ehrhart's volume conjecture
- Scientific career
- Fields: Mathematics

Eugène Ehrhart (29 April 1906 – 17 January 2000) was a French mathematician who in the 1960s introduced Ehrhart polynomials, which count the lattice points in a polytope with integral vertices, their reciprocity property, and their generalization to rational polytopes. Ehrhart received his high school diploma at the age of 22. He was a mathematics teacher in several high schools, and did mathematics research on his own time. He started publishing in mathematics in his 40s, and finished his PhD thesis at the age of 60.

== Selected publications ==
- Ehrhart, Eugène (1967), "Démonstration de la loi de réciprocité du polyèdre rationnel", Comptes Rendus de l'Académie des Sciences de Paris, Sér. A-B 265, A91–A94.
- Ehrhart, E. (1974), Polynômes arithmétiques et méthode des polyèdres en combinatoire, Institut de Recherche Mathématique Avancée, Strasbourg, 1974. Updated in: Ehrhart, E. (1977), Polynômes arithmétiques et méthode des polyèdres en combinatoire, International Series of Numerical Mathematics, Vol. 35. Birkhäuser Verlag, Basel-Stuttgart, 1977.
- Ehrhart, Eugène (1984), "Euler's Integers", The Fibonacci Quarterly, 22: 218–228.
