= Tamari =

Tamari may refer to:

- A type of soy sauce, produced mainly in the Chūbu region of Japan
- Tamari lattice, a mathematical lattice theory named after mathematician Dov Tamari
- Tamari Bar, restaurant in Seattle, Washington, U.S.
- Te tamari no atua, 1896 oil painting by Paul Gauguin
- Tamari, Ibaraki, village in Niihari District, Ibaraki Prefecture, Japan
- Tammari language, language spoken in Benin and Togo

== People ==
=== People with the surname Tamari ===
- Amiram Tamari (1913–1981) Israeli illustrator and artist
- Dov Tamari (mathematician) (1911–2006; born as Bernhard Teitler) German-born Israeli mathematician
- Dov Tamari (brigadier general) (born 1936) Israeli military leader
- Meir Tamari (1927–2021) Israeli economist
- Nehemiah Tamari (1946–1994) Israeli major general
- Salim Tamari (born 1945) Palestinian sociologist
- Vera Tamari (born 1945) Palestinian painter, ceramicist, sculptor, educator, art historian

=== People with the given name Tamari ===
- Tamari Chalaganidze (born 1995) Georgian tennis player
- Tamari Davis (born 2003) American track and field athlete
- Tamari Miyashiro (born 1987) American volleyball player
- Tamari Tatuashvili (born 1991) Georgian women's football defender

== See also ==
- Tammari (disambiguation)
- Temari (disambiguation)
- Tamaris (record label)
- Timarete (also known as Tamaris) Greek painter of the 5th century
