= Dov Tamari =

Dov Tamari may refer to:

- Dov Tamari (mathematician), German-born mathematician
- Dov Tamari (brigadier general), Israeli intelligence officer
