= Cyclohedron =

Polytope associated with combinatorial problems

The 2-dimensional cyclohedron W_{3} and the correspondence between its vertices and edges with a cycle on three vertices

In geometry, the cyclohedron is a d-dimensional polytope where d can be any non-negative integer. It was first introduced as a combinatorial object by Raoul Bott and Clifford Taubes and, for this reason, it is also sometimes called the Bott–Taubes polytope. It was later constructed as a polytope by Martin Markl and by Rodica Simion. Rodica Simion describes this polytope as an associahedron of type B.

The cyclohedron appears in the study of knot invariants.

== Construction ==
Cyclohedra belong to several larger families of polytopes, each providing a general construction. For instance, the cyclohedron belongs to the generalized associahedra that arise from cluster algebra, and to the graph-associahedra, a family of polytopes each corresponding to a graph. In the latter family, the graph corresponding to the $d$-dimensional cyclohedron is a cycle on $d+1$ vertices.

In topological terms, the configuration space of $d+1$ distinct points on the circle $S^1$ is a $(d+1)$-dimensional manifold, which can be compactified into a manifold with corners by allowing the points to approach each other. This compactification can be factored as $S^1 \times W_{d+1}$, where $W_{d+1}$ is the $d$-dimensional cyclohedron.

Just as the associahedron, the cyclohedron can be recovered by removing some of the facets of the permutohedron.

== Properties ==
The 2-dimensional cyclohedron as the centrally symmetric triangulations of the regular hexagon

The graph made up of the vertices and edges of the $d$-dimensional cyclohedron is the flip graph of the centrally symmetric partial triangulations of a convex polygon with $2d+2$ vertices. When $d$ goes to infinity, the asymptotic behavior of the diameter $\Delta$ of that graph is given by

$\lim_{d\rightarrow\infty}\frac{\Delta}{d}=\frac{5}{2}$.

== See also ==
- Associahedron
- Permutohedron
- Permutoassociahedron
