= Geometric graph theory =

Study of graphs defined by geometric means

Geometric graph theory in the broader sense is a large and amorphous subfield of graph theory, concerned with graphs defined by geometric means. In a stricter sense, geometric graph theory studies combinatorial and geometric properties of geometric graphs, meaning graphs drawn in the Euclidean plane with possibly intersecting straight-line edges, and topological graphs, where the edges are allowed to be arbitrary continuous curves connecting the vertices; thus, it can be described as "the theory of geometric and topological graphs" (Pach 2013). Geometric graphs are also known as spatial networks.

== Different types of geometric graphs ==
A planar straight-line graph is a graph in which the vertices are embedded as points in the Euclidean plane, and the edges are embedded as non-crossing line segments. Fáry's theorem states that any planar graph may be represented as a planar straight line graph. A triangulation is a planar straight line graph to which no more edges may be added, so called because every face is necessarily a triangle; a special case of this is the Delaunay triangulation, a graph defined from a set of points in the plane by connecting two points with an edge whenever there exists a circle containing only those two points.

The 1-skeleton of a polyhedron or polytope is the set of vertices and edges of said polyhedron or polytope. The skeleton of any convex polyhedron is a planar graph, and the skeleton of any k-dimensional convex polytope is a k-connected graph. Conversely, Steinitz's theorem states that any 3-connected planar graph is the skeleton of a convex polyhedron; for this reason, this class of graphs is also known as the polyhedral graphs.

A Euclidean graph is a graph in which the vertices represent points in the plane, and each edge is assigned the length equal to the Euclidean distance between its endpoints. The Euclidean minimum spanning tree is the minimum spanning tree of a Euclidean complete graph. It is also possible to define graphs by conditions on the distances; in particular, a unit distance graph is formed by connecting pairs of points that are a unit distance apart in the plane. The Hadwiger–Nelson problem concerns the chromatic number of these graphs.

An intersection graph is a graph in which each vertex is associated with a set and in which vertices are connected by edges whenever the corresponding sets have a nonempty intersection. When the sets are geometric objects, the result is a geometric graph. For instance, the intersection graph of line segments in one dimension is an interval graph; the intersection graph of unit disks in the plane is a unit disk graph. The Circle packing theorem states that the intersection graphs of non-crossing circles are exactly the planar graphs. Scheinerman's conjecture (proven in 2009) states that every planar graph can be represented as the intersection graph of line segments in the plane.

A Levi graph of a family of points and lines has a vertex for each of these objects and an edge for every incident point-line pair. The Levi graphs of projective configurations lead to many important symmetric graphs and cages.

The visibility graph of a closed polygon connects each pair of vertices by an edge whenever the line segment connecting the vertices lies entirely in the polygon. It is not known how to test efficiently whether an undirected graph can be represented as a visibility graph.

A partial cube is a graph for which the vertices can be associated with the vertices of a hypercube, in such a way that distance in the graph equals Hamming distance between the corresponding hypercube vertices. Many important families of combinatorial structures, such as the acyclic orientations of a graph or the adjacencies between regions in a hyperplane arrangement, can be represented as partial cube graphs. An important special case of a partial cube is the skeleton of the permutohedron, a graph in which vertices represent permutations of a set of ordered objects and edges represent swaps of objects adjacent in the order. Several other important classes of graphs including median graphs have related definitions involving metric embeddings (Bandelt & Chepoi 2008).

A flip graph is a graph formed from the triangulations of a point set, in which each vertex represents a triangulation and two triangulations are connected by an edge if they differ by the replacement of one edge for another. It is also possible to define related flip graphs for partitions into quadrilaterals or pseudotriangles, and for higher-dimensional triangulations. The flip graph of triangulations of a convex polygon forms the skeleton of the associahedron or Stasheff polytope. The flip graph of the regular triangulations of a point set (projections of higher-dimensional convex hulls) can also be represented as a skeleton, of the so-called secondary polytope.

== See also ==
- Topological graph theory
- Chemical graph
- Spatial network
