= Haya Freedman =

Israeli mathematician (1923–2005)

- חיה פרידמן
- Born: 1923; Lviv, Poland
- Died: 2005 (aged 81–82)
- Education: Hebrew University of Jerusalem, Queen Mary College
- Known for: Research on the Tamari lattice, Ring theory
- Scientific career
- Fields: Mathematics
- Workplaces: Birkbeck College, University of London, London School of Economics
- Doctoral advisor: Jacob Levitzki, Kurt Hirsch

Haya Freedman (Hebrew: חיה פרידמן; 1923–2005) was a Polish-born Israeli mathematician known for her research on the Tamari lattice and on ring theory, and as a teacher of mathematics at the London School of Economics.

== Early life and education ==
Haya Freedman was born in Lviv, which at that time was part of Poland, and at the age of ten moved to Mandatory Palestine. She earned a master's degree from the Hebrew University of Jerusalem, studying abstract algebra there under the supervision of Jacob Levitzki. She began doctoral studies under Dov Tamari in the early 1950s, doing research on the Tamari lattice that she would much later publish with Tamari. However, at that time her husband wanted to shift his own research from mathematics to computer science, and as part of that shift decided to move to England. Freedman moved with him in 1956, breaking off her studies. Instead, she completed a PhD at Queen Mary College in 1960, under the supervision of Kurt Hirsch.

== Academic career ==
In 1965, Freedman became a faculty member in mathematics in Birkbeck College, University of London. In 1966, Cyril Offord founded the sub-department of mathematics at the London School of Economics, and she became one of the founding faculty members there. She retired in 1989.

== Legacy ==
In her honour, the London School of Economics offers an annual prize, the Haya Freedman Prize, for the best dissertation in the applied mathematics MSc.
