= Bill Casselman =

American-Canadian mathematician (born 1941)

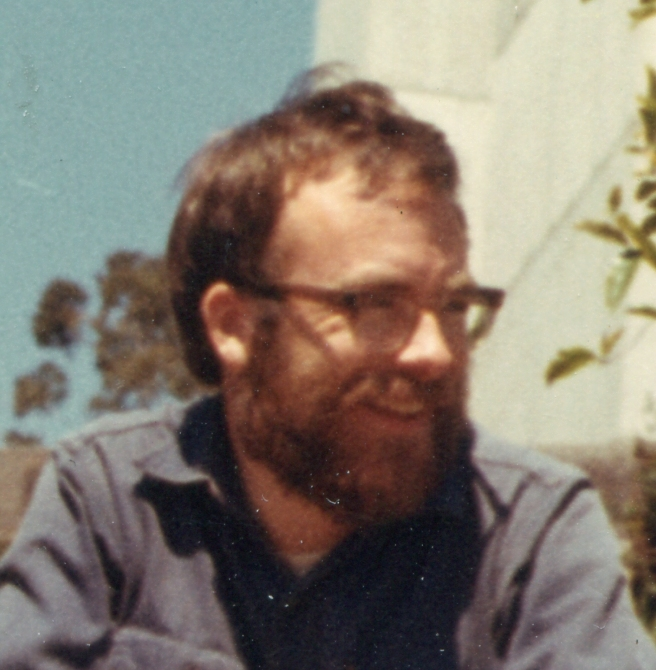
- Casselman in 1969
- Born: William Allen Casselman; November 27, 1941 (age 84); Glen Ridge, New Jersey, U.S.
- Citizenship: Canadian
- Education: Princeton University
- Scientific career
- Fields: Representation theory Automorphic forms Geometric combinatorics Structure of algebraic groups
- Workplaces: University of British Columbia
- Doctoral advisor: Goro Shimura

William Allen Casselman (born November 27, 1941) is an American Canadian mathematician who works in representation theory and automorphic forms. He is a professor emeritus at the University of British Columbia. He is closely connected to the Langlands program and has been involved in posting all of the work of Robert Langlands on the internet.

== Career ==
Casselman did his undergraduate work at Harvard College where his advisor was Raoul Bott and received his PhD from Princeton University in 1966 where his advisor was Goro Shimura. He was a visiting scholar at the Institute for Advanced Study in 1974, 1983, and 2001. He emigrated to Canada in 1971 and is a professor emeritus in mathematics at the University of British Columbia.

== Research ==
Casselman specializes in representation theory, automorphic forms, geometric combinatorics, and the structure of algebraic groups. He has an interest in mathematical graphics and has been the graphics editor of the Notices of the American Mathematical Society since January, 2001.

== Awards ==
In 2012, he became one of the inaugural fellows of the American Mathematical Society.

== Selected publications ==
- Casselman, Bill (1973). "On some results of Atkin and Lehner". Mathematische Annalen. 201 (4): 301–314. doi:10.1007/BF01428197. S2CID 121867474.
- Casselman, Bill (1977). "Characters and Jacquet modules". Mathematische Annalen. 230 (2): 101–105. doi:10.1007/BF01370657. ISSN 0025-5831. S2CID 121574262.
- Casselman, Bill (1980). "The unramified principal series of p-adic groups. I. The Spherical function". Compositio Mathematica. 40 (3): 387–406.
- Casselman, Bill; Shalika, Joseph (1980). "The unramified principal series of p-adic groups. II. The Whittaker function". Compositio Mathematica. 41 (2): 207–231.
- Casselman, Bill; Milicic, Dragan (1982). "representations". Duke Mathematical Journal. 49 (4): 869–930. doi:10.1215/S0012-7094-82-04943-2. ISSN 0012-7094.
- Borel, Armand; Casselman, Bill (1983). "L2-cohomology of locally symmetric manifolds of finite volume". Duke Mathematical Journal. 50 (3): 625–647. doi:10.1215/S0012-7094-83-05029-9. S2CID 122723214.
- Casselman, Bill; Shahidi, Freydoon (1998). "On irreducibility of standard modules for generic representations". Annales Scientifiques de l'École Normale Supérieure. 31 (4): 561–589. doi:10.1016/S0012-9593(98)80107-9.
- Casselman, Bill (2005). Mathematical Illustrations: A Manual of Geometry and PostScript. Cambridge University Press. ISBN 0521839211.
