= Temari =

Temari may refer to:

- Temari (toy), a traditional Japanese embroidered ball
- Temari Sushi, a type of sushi
- Temari Matsumoto (松本 テマリ), a Japanese manga artist
- Temari (Naruto), a fictional character in the anime and manga series Naruto by Masashi Kishimoto
- Temari (Shugo Chara!) a fictional character in the manga series Shugo Chara! by Peach-Pit
- "Temari", a song by Ninomae Ina'nis from re:VISION

== See also ==
- Temario Rivera, a Filipino political scientist
- Temarii Tinorua, a Tahitian footballer
- Tamari (disambiguation)
