= Medal of Courage =

Israeli military decoration

עיטור העוז
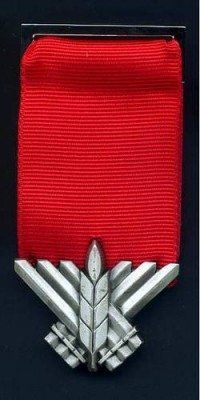
- Medal of Courage
- Type: Military decoration
- Awarded for: "Performing a valorous and life-risking deed while executing a combat role"
- Presented by: Israel Defense Forces
- Eligibility: Soldiers of the Israel Defense Forces
- Status: Currently awarded
- Established: 1970; 56 years ago
- First award: 1973

Highlights
- Total: 220
- Total recipients: 218
- Medal of Courage ribbon

Precedence
- Next (higher): Medal of Valor
- Next (lower): Medal of Distinguished Service

The Medal of Courage (Hebrew: עיטור העוז, Itur HaOz) is an Israeli military decoration. The medal is awarded for carrying out acts of gallantry at the risk of life, during combat duty. The medal was established in 1970 (though it has been given retroactively) by act of law in the Knesset.

== Design ==
The medal was designed by Dan Reisinger. On the obverse are six crossed swords and between them an olive branch. The reverse is the same.

The medal is attached to a red ribbon symbolizing the fire and blood in battle. Officially, two time recipients of the medal wear a small clasp in the form of the medal on its ribbon. In practice, Rav Aluf Amnon Lipkin-Shahak (the only person to be awarded the medal twice whilst still alive) wore two ribbons.

The medal is minted by the Israel Government Coins and Medals Corporation, is made of 25 gram silver/935 and the clasp is chrome plated metal.

== Recipients ==
As of 2024, 220 awards have been made, the latest in 2005 after a 23 year period in which the medal was not awarded. In 2007, it was announced that the medal would be awarded to six soldiers who fought during the Second Lebanon War. Two recipients have been awarded the medal twice.

=== Notable recipients ===
- Amnon Lipkin-Shahak is a double recipient.
- Meir Dagan received the medal for disarming a terrorist in 1971.
- Meir Har-Zion received the medal for his conduct as a Paratroopers company commander during a raid in 1956.
- Oved Ladishinsky was a double recipient.
- Rafael Eitan received the medal for his conduct during a raid to Syria in 1955.
- Roi Klein was posthumously awarded the medal for jumping on a grenade to save his fellow soldiers during the Second Lebanon War.
- Shmuel Gonen received the medal for his conduct during the Sinai War.
- Amir Drori was awarded the medal for his conduct during Operation "Hargol" (also known as Tawfiq raid) in 1960.
- Yitzhak Mordechai received the medal for his conduct during the Yom Kippur War.
- Yossi Ben Hanan received the medal for his conduct during the Yom Kippur War.
- Dov Tamari received the medal for his conduct as a paratrooper platoon leader during a raid in 1956.
- Paul Provda received the medal in 1965 for his conduct in battle (Levy Incident) for retrieving the body of a fellow member of the 601 (Levy) who had been killed while in his tractor plowing the border between Israel, Syria and Lebanon. Provda retrieved the body under heavy fire from enemies despite having sustained a serious injury.
