= Israeli Intelligence Corps =

Israel Defense Forces corps

Intelligence Corps
- חיל המודיעין
- Intelligence Corps logo
- Active: 1976–present
- Country: Israel
- Allegiance: Israel Defense Forces

Commanders
- Current commander: Avi Kenan

Insignia
- Flag

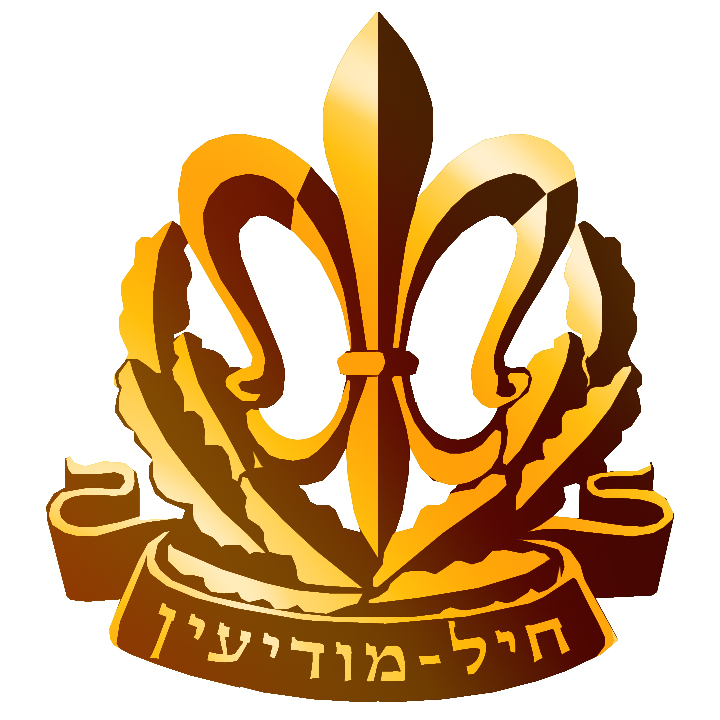
- Beret tag

The Israeli Intelligence Corps (Hebrew: חיל המודיעין, Heil HaModi'in), abbreviated to Haman (Hebrew: חמ"ן) is an Israel Defense Forces corps which falls under the jurisdiction of Military Intelligence Directorate (Aman) and is responsible for collecting, disseminating, and publishing intelligence information for the General Staff and the political branch.

== History ==
The corps was established as a result of the Agranat Commission's recommendation on the intelligence shortcomings in the Yom Kippur War. A Chief Intelligence Officer is detached from but subordinate to the head of Aman. On November 12, 1976, its first Chief Intelligence Officer, Brigadier-General Dov Tamari, was appointed.

The corps includes Unit 8200, which is the IDF central collection unit, responsible for SIGINT collection and cryptographical analysis, including the Hatzav Unit, responsible for collecting OSINT intelligence.

The corps also includes Unit 504, which is the IDF HUMINT collection and analysis unit.

The corps also engages in counter-intelligence and information security work, and presents general assessments. The primary and fundamental mission of the military corps is to provide the political and military echelon intelligential warning in real time of war and activity against Israel.
