= Tammari =

Tammari may refer to:

- Tammari people
- Tammari language

== See also ==
- Tamari (disambiguation)
