= Tamari Bar =

Bar and restaurant in Seattle, Washington, U.S.

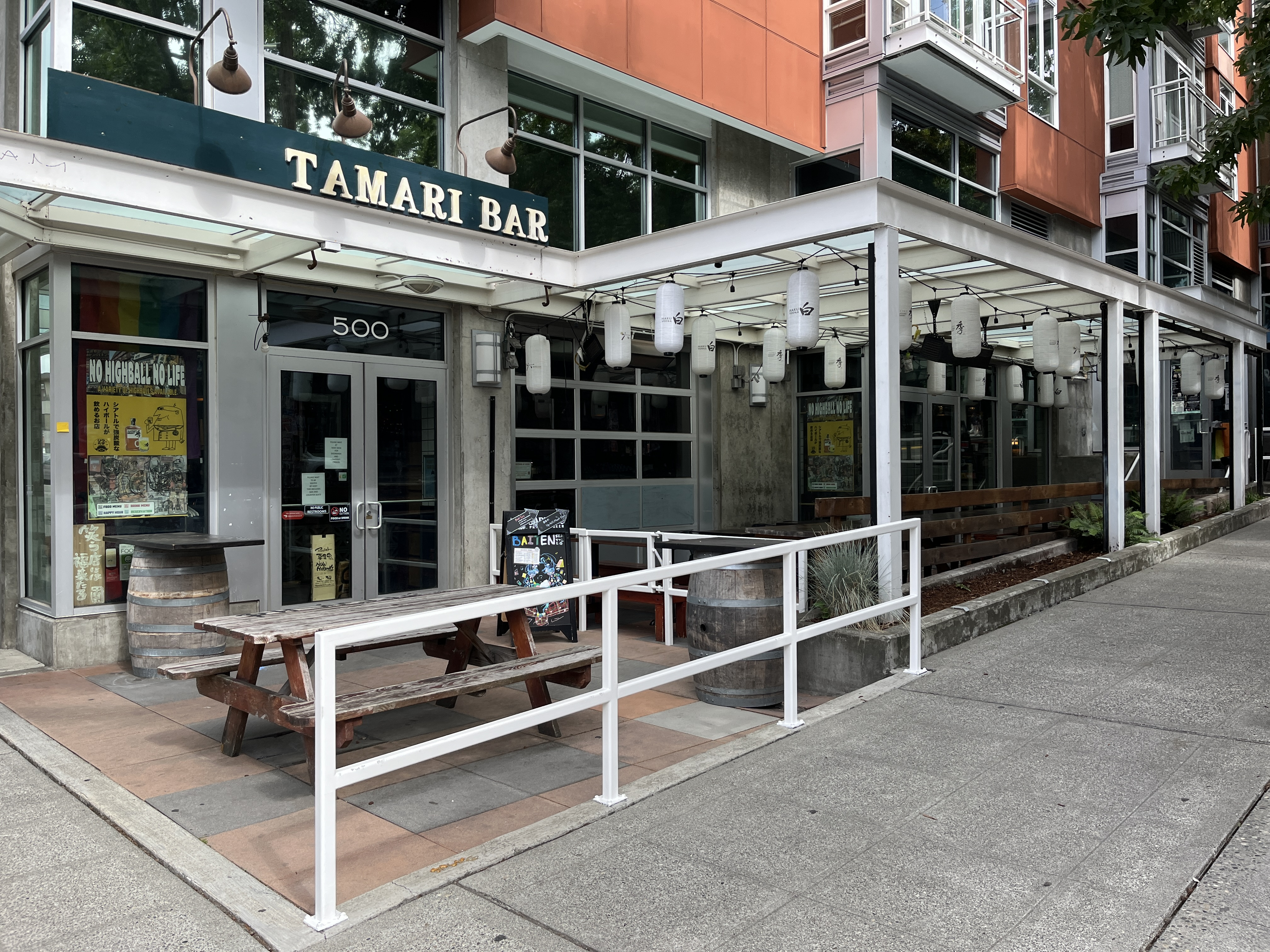
- The bar's exterior, 2024
- Interactive map of Tamari Bar

Restaurant information
- Food type: Japanese
- Location: 500 East Pine Street, Seattle, King, Washington, 98122, United States
- Coordinates: 47.6154°N 122.3253°W
- Website: tamaribarseattle.com

Tamari Bar is a bar and restaurant on Seattle's Capitol Hill, in the U.S. state of Washington. Chef and owner Makoto Kimoto opened the izakaya in February 2018, serving Japanese cuisine such as baozi, dandan noodles, onsen tamago, ramen, sushi and sashimi, and wagyu. The bar also serves cocktails and other drinks, as well as soft serve. Since 2022, the sibling establishment Baiten has also operated in Tamari, serving fruit sandwiches, floats, sundaes and other desserts with ice cream. Tamari has garnered a positive reception and became a vendor at T-Mobile Park in 2024.

== Description ==
The Asian-owned izakaya Tamari Bar operates on Pine Street, on Seattle's Capitol Hill. The restaurant serves "Japanese-based global cuisine inspired by years of cooking, eating and traveling", according to KOMO-TV. AJ Rathbun of Seattle Magazine wrote: "Tamari Bar isn't huge, and falls into the almost-industrial vibe – open duct work and pipes hanging from a high ceiling, brick walls, clean lines, large street-side windows. Enough individual touches provide personality, like a clock made from chopsticks, a stretch of brick where Japanese TV and movies are projected on to, and scattered shelves in various spots with Sriracha bottles, Cup O'Noodle soups, Japanese whiskey, glass jars of food and spices, and other curiosities." Tamari has a Suntory Toki highball machine.

=== Menu ===
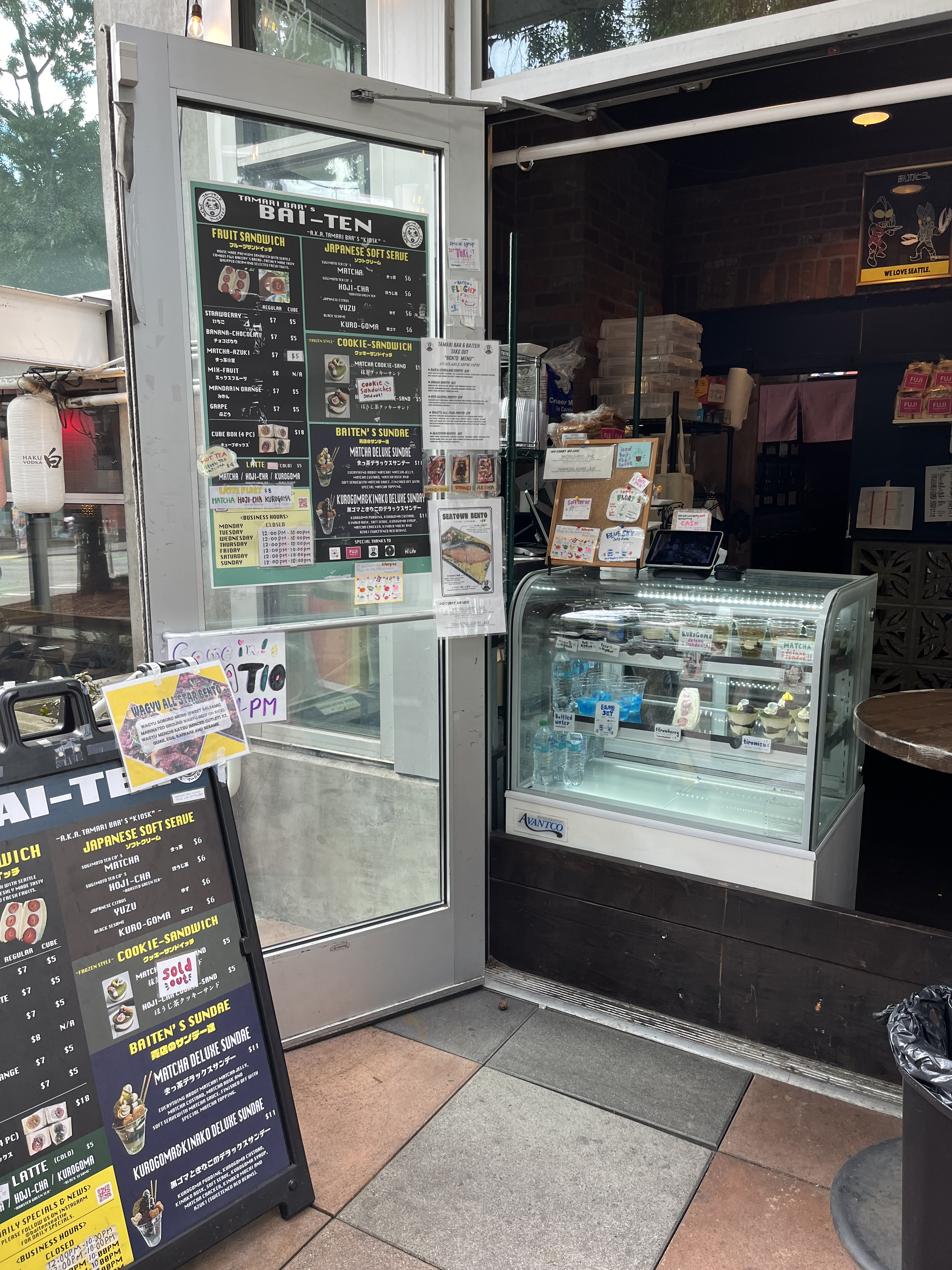
Baiten in 2024

Tamari serves Japanese cuisine. Food options include sushi and sashimi, vegetable chips with Japanese honey mustard and sriracha dipping sauces, and a dish called My Nira-Tama, which has Chinese chives, onsen tamago (soft-boiled egg), and chili oil. The Bento Box features nine different starters; Tamari only makes eighteen boxes per night. The Asian Poutine has ground pork, nori, parmesan cheese, and chili oil, and the wagyu beef is served with garlic and wasabi.

The Buta Dumplings are pork dumplings with chili and garlic oil, and the Crazy Journey is chicken karaage. Among sushi rolls are the Aburi (miso aioli, jalapeno, and roe) and the Hama Cheese (yellowtail and parmesan). Tamari also serves dandan noodles, matcha cheesecake, fried chicken baozi, cilantro pesto ramen, and soft serve. The ice cream flight includes Snoqualmie Ice Cream with six types of syrup: black sesame, hojicha, matcha, yuzu, and two rotating flavors. Among other unique toppings is Japanese whiskey caramel syrup. Some of Tamari's soft serve options come from Baiten, which has been described as a sibling establishment.

Cocktail options at Tamari include: the Hola!! Geisha, described as a "lime-and-ginger tequila drink with a Pacific rim of matcha salt"; the Hot Toki Toddy with Suntory Toki whiskey, honey, lemon, and Japanese plum wine; as well as the Yuzu Fashioned, a version of an Old fashioned with bourbon, bitters, and yuzu syrup that is garnished with rum-marinated cherries and mint. Tamari also serves beer, sake, and wine.

== History ==
Makoto Kimoto is the chef and owner of Tamari, which opened on February 14 (Valentine's Day), 2018, with Nobu Watanabe as a chef and Kan Terao as the general manager. It operates in the space that previously housed World of Beers and 500 East: A Social Club. Tamari participated in Seattle Restaurant Week in 2018.

In 2020, during the COVID-19 pandemic, Tamari sold cocktail kits to make highballs, a Moscow mule, and a yuzu mimosa. The business became a vendor at T-Mobile Park in 2024.

In addition to Baiten, Rondo and (now defunct) Suika have also been described as sibling establishments of Tamari.

=== Baiten ===
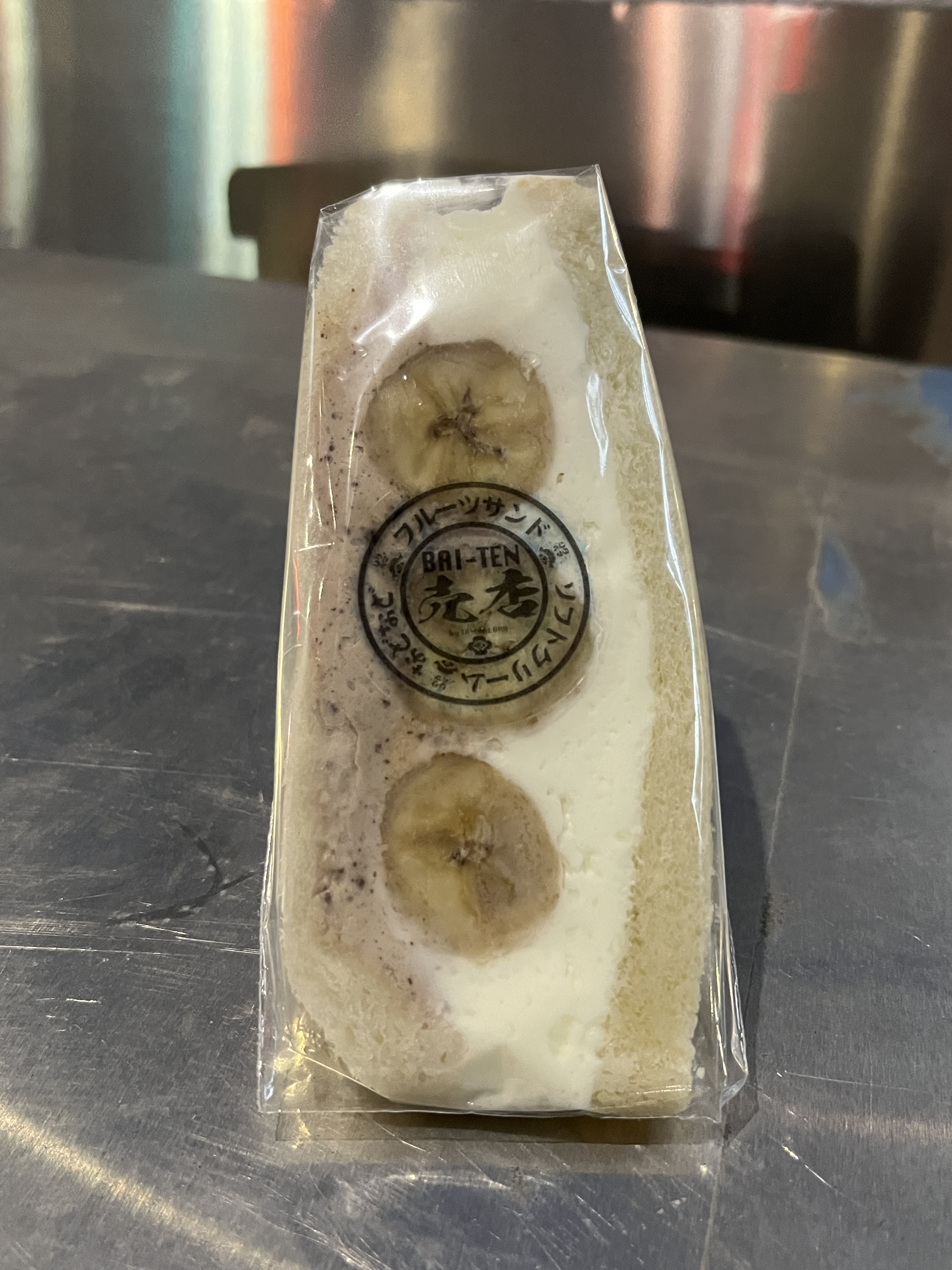
Banana-chocolate fruit sandwich from Baiten

The Asian-owned bakery Baiten, which began operating within Tamari on January 27, 2022, has been described as a collaboration with Fuji Bakery and Sugimoto Tea Company. Baiten serves fruit sandwiches ("sandos"), iced hoji latte floats, and other desserts such as ice cream cookies.

One sando has banana and chocolate chips, and another with mixed fruit has grape, kiwi, mandarin orange, pineapple, and strawberry. Among soft serve options is a sundae with cookie, Pocky, and waffle toppings. Flavors include black sesame, matcha, soy sauce, and yuzu. The Toki highball soft serve has vanilla ice cream and Japanese whiskey caramel syrup.

== Reception ==
In 2018, food critic for The Seattle Times Providence Cicero included Tamari in an annual "Critic's Choice" list of the city's best new restaurants. Meg van Huygen and Sophie Grossman included Tamari Bar in Eater Seattle's 2024 list of fifteen "sensational" sushi restaurants in the metropolitan area. Aimee Rizzo and Kayla Sager-Riley included Baiten in The Infatuation's 2024 overview of Seattle's best soft serve.

== See also ==
- List of Japanese restaurants
