= Fulton–MacPherson compactification =

Configuration space

In geometry, the Fulton–MacPherson compactification of the configuration space of n distinct labeled points in a compact complex manifold is a compact complex manifold that contains the configuration space as an open dense subset and is constructed in a canonical way. The notion was introduced by Fulton & MacPherson (1994).
