= Associahedron =

Convex polytope of parenthesizations

Associahedron K_{5} (front)

Associahedron K_{5} (back)

K_{5} is the Hasse diagram of the Tamari lattice T_{4}.

The 9 faces of K_{5} Each vertex in the above Hasse diagram has the ovals from the 3 adjacent faces. Faces whose ovals intersect do not touch.

In mathematics, an associahedron K_{n} is an (n − 2)-dimensional convex polytope in which each vertex corresponds to a way of correctly inserting opening and closing parentheses in a string of n letters, and the edges correspond to single application of the associativity rule. Equivalently, the vertices of an associahedron correspond to the triangulations of a regular polygon with n + 1 sides, and the edges correspond to edge flips in which a single diagonal is removed from a triangulation and replaced by a different diagonal. Associahedra are also called Stasheff polytopes after the work of Jim Stasheff, who rediscovered them in the early 1960s after earlier work on them by Dov Tamari.

== Examples ==
The one-dimensional associahedron K_{3} represents the two parenthesizations ((xy)z) and (x(yz)) of three symbols, or the two triangulations of a square. It is itself a line segment.

The two-dimensional associahedron K_{4} represents the five parenthesizations of four symbols, or the five triangulations of a regular pentagon. It is itself a pentagon and is related to the pentagon diagram of a monoidal category.

The three-dimensional associahedron K_{5} is an enneahedron with nine faces (three disjoint quadrilaterals and six pentagons) and fourteen vertices, and its dual is the triaugmented triangular prism.

== Realization ==
3D model of an associahedron

Initially Jim Stasheff considered these objects as curvilinear polytopes. Subsequently, they were given coordinates as convex polytopes in several different ways; see the introduction of Ceballos, Santos & Ziegler (2015) for a survey.

One method of realizing the associahedron is as the secondary polytope of a regular polygon. In this construction, each triangulation of a regular polygon with n + 1 sides corresponds to a point in (n + 1)-dimensional Euclidean space, whose ith coordinate is the total area of the triangles incident to the ith vertex of the polygon. For instance, the two triangulations of the unit square give rise in this way to two four-dimensional points with coordinates (1, 1/2, 1, 1/2) and (1/2, 1, 1/2, 1). The convex hull of these two points is the realization of the associahedron K_{3}. Although it lives in a 4-dimensional space, it forms a line segment (a 1-dimensional polytope) within that space. Similarly, the associahedron K_{4} can be realized in this way as a regular pentagon in five-dimensional Euclidean space, whose vertex coordinates are the cyclic permutations of the vector (1, 2 + φ, 1, 1 + φ, 1 + φ) where φ denotes the golden ratio. Because the possible triangles within a regular hexagon have areas that are integer multiples of each other, this construction can be used to give integer coordinates (in six dimensions) to the three-dimensional associahedron K_{5}; however (as the example of K_{4} already shows) this construction in general leads to irrational numbers as coordinates.

Another realization, due to Jean-Louis Loday, is based on the correspondence of the vertices of the associahedron with n-leaf rooted binary trees and produces integer coordinates in (n − 1)-dimensional space. The ith coordinate of Loday's realization is a_{i}b_{i}, where a_{i} is the number of leaf descendants of the left child of the ith internal node of the tree (in left-to-right order) and b_{i} is the number of leaf descendants of the right child. The coordinates of each vertex sum to a constant and can thus be considered as barycentric coordinates on the regular (n − 2)-simplex.

It is possible to realize the associahedron directly in (n − 2)-dimensional space as a polytope for which all of the face normal vectors have coordinates that are 0, +1, or −1. There are exponentially many combinatorially distinct ways of doing this.

K_{5} as an order-4 truncated triangular bipyramid

Because K_{5} is a polyhedron only with vertices in which 3 edges come together it is possible for a hydrocarbon to exist (similar to the Platonic hydrocarbons) whose chemical structure is represented by the skeleton of K_{5}. This "associahedrane" C_{14}H_{14} would have the SMILES notation: C12-C3-C4-C1-C5-C6-C2-C7-C3-C8-C4-C5-C6-C78. Its edges would be of approximately equal length, but the vertices of each face would not necessarily be coplanar. Indeed, K_{5} is a near-miss Johnson solid: it looks like it might be possible to make from squares and regular pentagons, but it is not. If the pentagonal faces are chosen as regular pentagons, then the quadrilateral faces will not be planar, so any realization as a convex polyhedron must cause the pentagonal faces to be irregular.

== Number of k-faces ==
| k n | 1 | 2 | 3 | 4 | 5 | Σ |
|---|---|---|---|---|---|---|
| 1 | 1 | | | | | 1 |
| 2 | 1 | 2 | | | | 3 |
| 3 | 1 | 5 | 5 | | | 11 |
| 4 | 1 | 9 | 21 | 14 | | 45 |
| 5 | 1 | 14 | 56 | 84 | 42 | 197 |

The number of (n − k)-dimensional faces of the associahedron of order n (K_{n+1}) is given by the number triangle (n, k), shown on the right.

The number of vertices in K_{n+1} is the n-th Catalan number (right diagonal in the triangle).

The number of facets in K_{n+1} (for n ≥ 2) is the n-th triangular number minus one (second column in the triangle), because each facet corresponds to a 2-subset of the n objects whose groupings form the Tamari lattice T_{n}, except the 2-subset that contains the first and the last element.

The number of faces of all dimensions (including the associahedron itself as a face, but not including the empty set) is a Schröder–Hipparchus number (row sums of the triangle).

== Diameter ==
In the late 1980s, in connection with the problem of rotation distance, Daniel Sleator, Robert Tarjan, and William Thurston provided a proof that the diameter of the n-dimensional associahedron K_{n + 2} is at most 2n − 4 for infinitely many n and for all "large enough" values of n. They also proved that this upper bound is tight when n is large enough, and conjectured that "large enough" means "strictly greater than 9". This conjecture was proved in 2012 by Lionel Pournin.

== Scattering amplitudes ==
In 2017, Mizera and Arkani-Hamed et al. showed that the associahedron plays a central role in the theory of scattering amplitudes for the bi-adjoint cubic scalar theory. In particular, there exists an associahedron in the space of scattering kinematics, and the tree level scattering amplitude is the volume of the dual associahedron. The associahedron also helps explaining the relations between scattering amplitudes of open and closed strings in string theory.

== See also ==
- Cyclohedron, a polytope whose definition allows parentheses to wrap around in cyclic order.
- Flip graph, a generalisation of the 1-skeleton of the associahedron.
- Permutohedron, a polytope that is defined from commutativity in a similar way to the definition of the associahedron from associativity.
- Permutoassociahedron, a polytope whose vertices are bracketed permutations.
- Tamari lattice, a lattice whose graph is the skeleton of the associahedron.
