= Dov Tamari (brigadier general) =

Israeli military leader

- דב תמרי
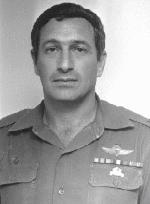
- Born: 1936 (age 89–90)
- Military career
- Allegiance: Israel Defense Forces
- Service years: 1963–95
- Rank: Tat aluf (Brigadier general)
- Nickname: Dovik
- Unit: Paratroopers Brigade
- Commands: Sayeret Matkal, the 401st Armored Brigade, the 162nd Division, Chief Intelligence Officer
- Conflicts: 1956 Sinai War; Six-Day War; War of Attrition; Yom Kippur War; Operation Litani
- Awards: Medal of Courage; Chief Of Staff (Ramatkal) Citation (2)

Dov Tamari (Hebrew: דב תמרי; born 1936) was an Israeli military leader. He retired as a brigadier general. He held several prominent posts, including the IDF's Chief Intelligence Officer.

== Military service ==
Tamari was drafted into the IDF in 1954. He volunteered as a paratrooper in the Paratroopers Brigade. He served as a soldier and a squad leader and took part in the Reprisal operations. In 1956 he became an infantry officer after completing Officer Candidate School and returned to the Paratroopers Brigade as a platoon leader.

On 10 October 1956, during Operation Samaria, in which the Paratroopers Brigade attacked the Jordanian military stronghold in Qalqilya, Tamari's force was separated from the main force and came under heavy attack. Tamari showed extraordinary bravery and his force repelled the Jordanian force. For his actions he was decorated with the Medal of Courage.

Tamari fought in the 1956 Sinai War and was wounded during the battle for Mitla Pass. Afterwards he led a paratrooper company and the Brigade's reconnaissance company. He was appointed commander of Sayeret Matkal, and led its men during clandestine operations and in the Samu Incident. For his actions as the commander of Sayeret Matkal Tamari received two Chief of Staff (Ramatkal) Citations.

During the Six-Day War he commanded a reserve Paratroopers battalion.

He later commanded the 401st Armored Brigade.

During the Yom Kippur War Tamari served as the deputy commander of the 162nd Division. After the war he commanded the 162nd Division and served as the first Chief Intelligence Officer.

He retired in 1979 in the rank of brigadier general.

Tamari hold a Ph.D. from University of Haifa in military history.
