= Permutohedron =

Polytope whose vertices represent permutations

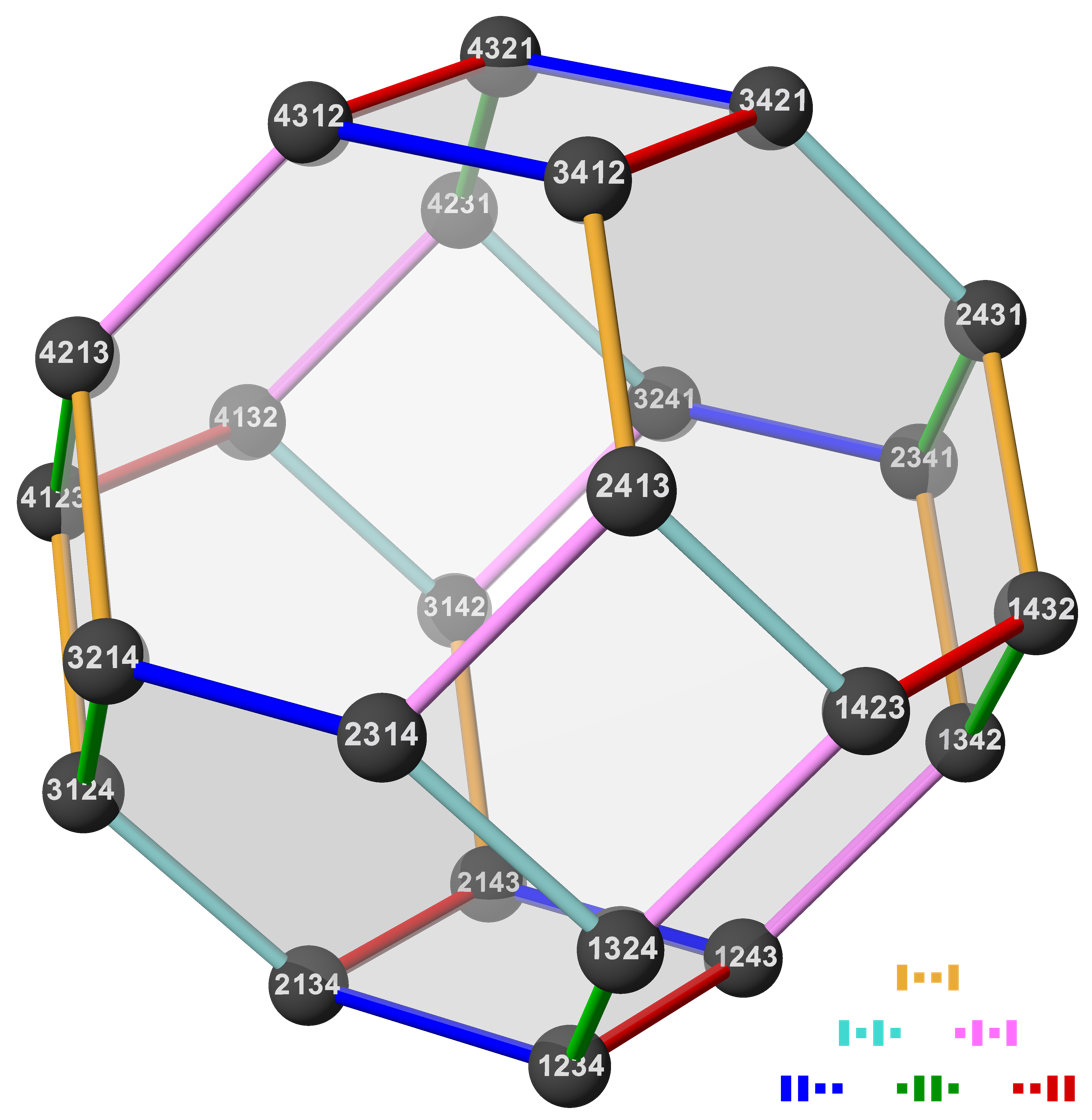
The permutohedron of order 4

In mathematics, the permutohedron (also spelled permutahedron) of order n is an (n − 1)-dimensional polytope embedded in an n-dimensional space. Its vertex coordinates (labels) are the permutations of the first n natural numbers. Two permutations connected by an edge differ in only two places (one transposition), and the numbers on these places are neighbors (differ in value by 1).

The image on the right shows the permutohedron of order 4, which is the truncated octahedron. Its vertices are the 24 permutations of (1, 2, 3, 4). Parallel edges have the same edge color. The 6 edge colors correspond to the 6 possible transpositions of 4 elements, i.e. they indicate in which two places the connected permutations differ. (E.g. red edges connect permutations that differ in the last two places.)

== History ==
According to Günter M. Ziegler (1995), permutohedra were first studied by Pieter Hendrik Schoute (1911). The name permutoèdre was coined by Georges Th. Guilbaud and Pierre Rosenstiehl (1963). They describe the word as barbaric, but easy to remember, and submit it to the criticism of their readers.

The alternative spelling permutahedron is sometimes also used. Permutohedra are sometimes called permutation polytopes, but this terminology is also used for the related Birkhoff polytope, defined as the convex hull of permutation matrices. More generally, V. Joseph Bowman (1972) uses that term for any polytope whose vertices have a bijection with the permutations of some set.

== Vertices, edges, and facets ==
vertices, edges, facets, faces
Face dimension d = n − k.

   k = 1    2    3    4    5
n
1      1                               1
2      1    2                          3
3      1    6    6                    13
4      1   14   36   24               75
5      1   30  150  240  120         541

The permutohedron of order n has n! vertices, each of which is adjacent to n − 1 others. The number of edges is ((n − 1) n!)/2, and their length is √2.

Two vertices that are connected by an edge differ by a swap of two coordinates whose values differ by 1. The pair of swapped places corresponds to the direction of the edge. (In the example image the vertices (3, 2, 1, 4) and (2, 3, 1, 4) are connected by a blue edge and differ by swapping 2 and 3 on the first two places. The values 2 and 3 differ by 1. All blue edges correspond to swaps of coordinates on the first two places.)

The number of facets is 2^{n} − 2, because they correspond to non-empty proper subsets S of {1 ... n}. The vertices of a facet corresponding to subset S have in common, that their coordinates on places in S are smaller than the rest.

Facet examples
For order 3 the facets are the 6 edges, and for order 4 they are the 14 faces. The coordinates on places i where i ∈ S are marked with a dark background. It can be seen, that they are smaller than the rest. The square on top corresponds to the subset {3, 4}. In its four vertices the coordinates on the last two places have the smallest values (namely 1 and 2).
order 3		order 4		
1-element subsets	2-element subsets	1-element subsets	2-element subsets	3-element subsets

More generally, the faces of dimensions 0 (vertices) to n − 1 (the permutohedron itself) correspond to the strict weak orderings of the set {1 ... n}. So the number of all faces is the n-th ordered Bell number. A face of dimension d corresponds to an ordering with k = n − d equivalence classes.

Face examples
order 3	order 4
The images above show the face lattices of the permutohedra of order 3 and 4 (without the empty faces). Each face center is labelled with a strict weak ordering. E.g. the square on top as 3 4 | 1 2, which represents ({3, 4}, {1, 2}). The orderings are partially ordered by refinement, with the finer ones being on the outside. Moving along an edge toward the inside means merging two neighbouring equivalence classes. The vertex labels a | b | c | d interpreted as permutations (a, b, c, d) are those forming the Cayley graph. Facets among the faces The before mentioned facets are among these faces, and correspond to orderings with two equivalence classes. The first one is used as the subset S assigned to the facet, so the ordering is (S, S^{c}). The images below show how the facets of the n-permutohedron correspond to the simplical projection of the n-cube. The binary coordinate labels correspond to the subsets S, e.g. 0011 to {3, 4}. (The vertex projected to the center does not correspond to a facet. Nor does its opposite vertex in the n-cube, which is not part of the projection.)

The number of faces of dimension d = n − k in the permutohedron of order n is given by the triangle T (sequence A019538 in the OEIS):
$$T(n,k) = k! \cdot \left\{{n\atop k}\right\}$$
with $\textstyle \left\{{n\atop k}\right\}$ representing the Stirling numbers of the second kind.

It is shown on the right together with its row sums, the ordered Bell numbers.

== Other properties ==
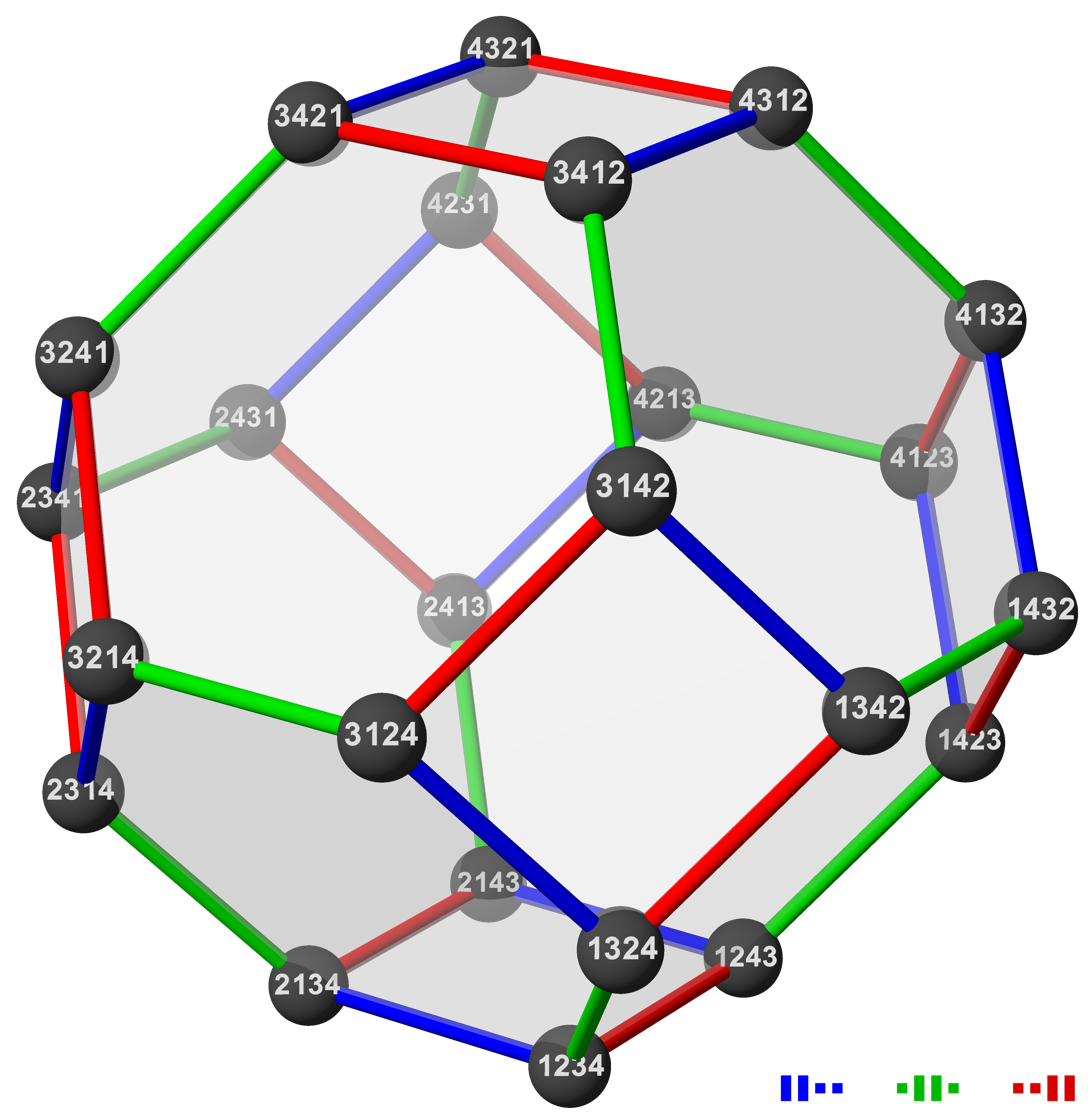
The permutohedron-like Cayley graph of S_{4} (see here for a comparison with the permutohedron)

The permutohedron is vertex-transitive: the symmetric group S_{n} acts on the permutohedron by permutation of coordinates.

The permutohedron is a zonotope; a translated copy of the permutohedron can be generated as the Minkowski sum of the n(n − 1)/2 line segments that connect the pairs of the standard basis vectors.

The vertex-edge graph of the permutohedron is the Bruhat graph, which is a Cayley graph of the symmetric group generated by the transpositions that swap consecutive elements. The vertices of the Cayley graph are the inverse permutations of those in the permutohedron. The image on the right shows the Cayley graph of S4. Its edge colors represent the 3 generating transpositions: (1, 2), (2, 3), (3, 4).

This Cayley graph is Hamiltonian; a Hamiltonian cycle may be found by the Steinhaus–Johnson–Trotter algorithm.

== Tessellation of the space ==
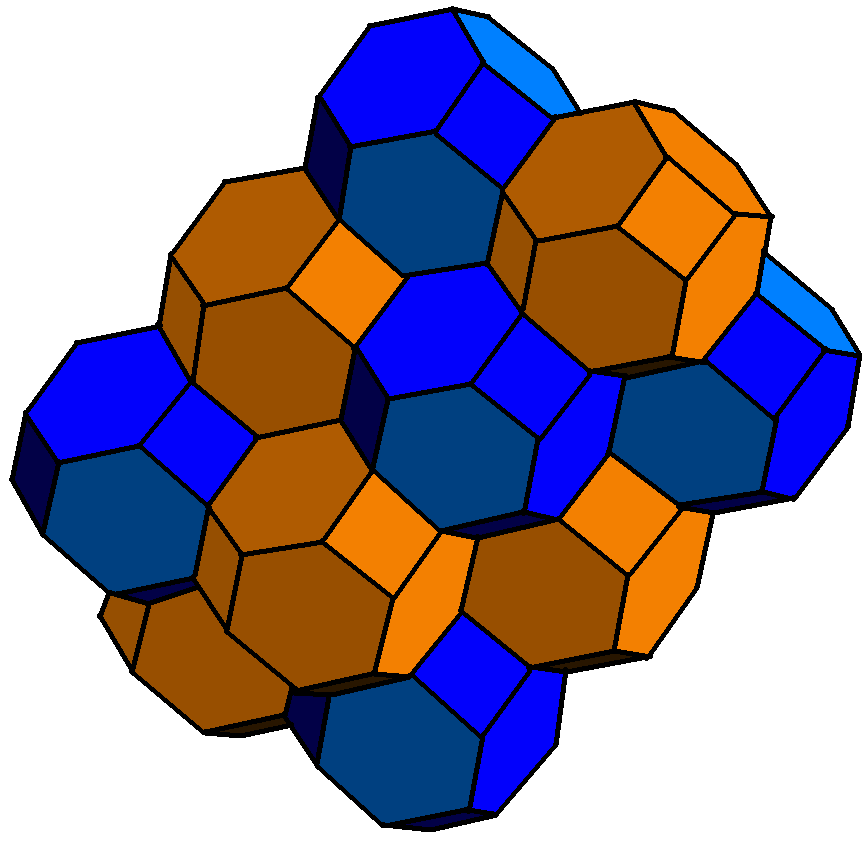
Tesselation of space by permutohedra of orders 3 and 4

The permutohedron of order n lies entirely in the (n − 1)-dimensional hyperplane consisting of all points whose coordinates sum to the number:

$$1 + 2 + \ldots + n = \frac{n(n+1)}{2}$$

Moreover, this hyperplane can be tiled by infinitely many translated copies of the permutohedron. Each of them differs from the basic permutohedron by an element of a certain (n − 1)-dimensional lattice, which consists of the n-tuples of integers that sum to zero and whose residues (modulo n) are all equal:
$$\begin{align}
& x_1 + x_2 + \ldots + x_n = 0 \\
& x_1 \equiv x_2 \equiv \ldots \equiv x_n \pmod n.
\end{align}$$

This is the lattice $A_{n-1}^*$, the dual lattice of the root lattice $A_{n-1}$. In other words, the permutohedron is the Voronoi cell for $A_{n-1}^*$. Accordingly, this lattice is sometimes called the permutohedral lattice.

Thus, the permutohedron of order 4 shown above tiles the 3-dimensional space by translation. Here the 3-dimensional space is the affine subspace of the 4-dimensional space $\R^4$ with coordinates x, y, z, w that consists of the 4-tuples of real numbers whose sum is 10,

$$x + y + z + w = 10.$$

One easily checks that for each of the following four vectors,

$$(1,1,1,-3),\ (1,1,-3,1),\ (1,-3,1,1),\ (-3,1,1,1),$$

the sum of the coordinates is zero and all coordinates are congruent to 1 (mod 4). Any three of these vectors generate the translation lattice.

The tessellations formed in this way from the order-2, order-3, and order-4 permutohedra, respectively, are the apeirogon, the regular hexagonal tiling, and the bitruncated cubic honeycomb. The dual tessellations contain all simplex facets, although they are not regular polytopes beyond order-3.

== Examples ==
Order 2	Order 3	Order 4	Order 5	Order 6
2 vertices	6 vertices	24 vertices	120 vertices	720 vertices
line segment	hexagon	truncated octahedron	omnitruncated 5-cell	omnitruncated 5-simplex

== See also ==
- Associahedron
- Cyclohedron
- Permutoassociahedron
