= Tamari lattice =

Algebraic structure

Tamari lattice of order 4

In mathematics, the Tamari lattice is an algebraic structure that concisely represents some of the important logical and geometric properties of associativity. More formally, the Tamari lattice of order n, introduced by Dov Tamari (1951) and sometimes notated T_{n} or Y_{n}, is a partially ordered set in which the elements consist of all ways of bracketing a sequence of n+1 letters using n pairs of parentheses, with the ordering induced by only rightward applications of the associative law ((xy)z) → (x(yz)). For instance, T_{3} contains five elements (((ab)c)d), ((ab)(cd)), ((a(bc))d), (a((bc)d)), and (a(b(cd))), with (((ab)c)d) < ((ab)(cd)) < (a(b(cd))) and (((ab)c)d) < ((a(bc))d) < (a((bc)d)) < (a(b(cd))). (The outermost pair of parentheses is redundant and often omitted when naming the elements of T_{n}, as in the depiction of T_{4} shown in the figure.)

The number of elements in the Tamari lattice of order n is the nth Catalan number C_{n}. Its Hasse diagram is isomorphic to the skeleton of the associahedron of dimension n-1.

The lattice property for the order (i.e., that any two bracketings have a join and meet) was stated without proof by Dov Tamari (1951) in his thesis. The property is non-trivial, and was established rigorously by Tamari together with his student Haya Freedman (Friedman & Tamari 1967). A simpler proof appeared later with Tamari's student Samuel Huang (Huang & Tamari 1972).

The Tamari lattice can be described in several other equivalent ways:

- It is the poset of binary trees with n nodes and n+1 leaves, ordered by tree rotation operations.
- It is the poset of triangulations of a convex n-gon, ordered by flip operations that substitute one diagonal of the polygon for another.
- It is the poset of sequences of n integers a_{1}, ..., a_{n}, ordered coordinatewise, such that i ≤ a_{i} ≤ n and if i ≤ j ≤ a_{i} then a_{j} ≤ a_{i} (Huang & Tamari 1972).
- It is the poset of ordered forests, in which one forest is earlier than another in the partial order if, for every j, the jth node in a preorder traversal of the first forest has at least as many descendants as the jth node in a preorder traversal of the second forest (Knuth 2005).

== Notation and indexing ==
The notation Y_{n} is sometimes used for the Tamari lattice of order n (Chapoton 2005), which has the mnemonic value that the elements of the lattice may be considered as binary trees with n Y-shaped binary nodes. Note that the corresponding associahedron of dimension n-1 is notated K_{n+1} since the indexing is by the number of leaves in the binary trees that form its vertices, rather than by the number of nodes.
