= Dov Tamari (mathematician) =

German mathematician

- דב תמרי
- Born: Bernhard Teitler; April 29, 1911; Fulda, Hesse, German Empire (now Germany)
- Died: August 11, 2006 (aged 95); Jerusalem, Israel
- Education: University of Paris (PhD)
- Known for: Tamari lattice
- Scientific career
- Fields: Mathematics
- Doctoral advisor: Paul Dubreil

Dov Tamari (Hebrew: דב תמרי; born Bernhard Teitler; 29 April 1911 – 11 August 2006) was a German-born mathematician. He lived in Mandatory Palestine (now Israel), and in New York City.

== Biography ==
Dov Tamari was born under the name Bernhard Teitler on 29 April 1911 in Fulda, German Empire (now Germany). He left Nazi Germany for the British Mandate for Palestine in 1933. He was known for his work in logic and combinatorics, and the Tamari lattice is named after him.

Tamari earned a doctorate of science from the University of Paris in 1951, under the direction of Paul Dubreil. His students include Carlton Maxson and Kevin Osondu.

Tamari was living in New York City in 1990, and he died in Jerusalem in 2006.

== Selected publications ==
- Tamari, Dov (1948). "On a certain classification of rings and semigroups". Bulletin of the American Mathematical Society. 54 (2): 153–159. doi:10.1090/S0002-9904-1948-08972-8. ISSN 0002-9904.
- —— (1953). "On the embedding of Birkhoff-Witt rings in quotient fields". Proceedings of the American Mathematical Society. 4 (2): 197–202. doi:10.1090/S0002-9939-1953-0053920-5. ISSN 0002-9939.
- —— (1954). "Monoïdes préordonnés et chaînes de Malcev" (PDF). Bulletin de la Société Mathématique de France. 82: 53–96. doi:10.24033/bsmf.1446.
- Bunting, Paul W.; van Leeuwen, Jan; —— (1978). "Deciding associativity for partial multiplication tables of order $3$". Mathematics of Computation. 32 (142): 593. doi:10.1090/S0025-5718-1978-0498906-7. ISSN 0025-5718.
