= Priority matching =

Graph matching with max number of high-priority vertices

In graph theory, a priority matching (also called: maximum priority matching) is a matching that maximizes the number of high-priority vertices that participate in the matching. Formally, we are given a graph G = (V, E), and a partition of the vertex-set V into some k subsets, V_{1}, …, V_{k}, called priority classes. A priority matching is a matching that, among all possible matchings, saturates the largest number of vertices from V_{1}; subject to this, it saturates the largest number of vertices from V_{2}; subject to this, it saturates the largest number of vertices from V_{3}; and so on.

Priority matchings were introduced by Alvin Roth, Tayfun Sonmez and Utku Unver in the context of kidney exchange. In this problem, the vertices are patient-donor pairs, and each edge represents a mutual medical compatibility. For example, an edge between pair 1 and pair 2 indicates that donor 1 is compatible with patient 2 and donor 2 is compatible with patient 1. The priority classes correspond to medical priority among patients. For example, some patients are in a more severe condition so they must be matched first. Roth, Sonmez and Unver assumed that each priority-class contains a single vertex, i.e., the priority classes induce a total order among the pairs.

Later, Yasunori Okumura extended the work to priority-classes that may contain any number of vertices. He also showed how to find a priority matching efficiently using an algorithm for maximum-cardinality matching, with a run-time complexity of O(|V||E| + |V|^{2} log |V|).

Jonathan S. Turner presented a variation of the augmenting path method (Edmonds' algorithm) that finds a priority matching in time O(|V||E|). Later, he found a faster algorithm for bipartite graphs: the algorithm runs in time

$$O(k |E| \sqrt{|V|} )$$

== See also ==
- Maximum cardinality matching
- Rank-maximal matching
