= Matching preclusion =

Robustness of graph perfect matchings

The matching preclusion number $\mathrm{mp}(G)$ of the graph $G$ on the left is 2, found by removing a minimum of 2 edges as shown on the right.

In graph theory, a branch of mathematics, the matching preclusion number of a graph $G$, denoted $\mathrm{mp}(G)$, is the minimum number of edges whose deletion results in the elimination of all perfect matchings or near-perfect matchings (matchings that cover all but one vertex in a graph with an odd number of vertices). Matching preclusion measures the quality of a graph as a communications network topology for distributed algorithms that require each node of the distributed system to be matched with a neighboring partner node.

In many graphs, $\mathrm{mp}(G)$ is equal to the minimum degree of any vertex in the graph, because deleting all edges incident to a single vertex prevents that vertex from being matched. This set of edges is called a trivial matching preclusion set. A variant definition, the conditional matching preclusion number, asks for the minimum number of edges the deletion of which results in a graph that has neither a perfect or near-perfect matching nor any isolated vertices.

It is NP-complete to test whether the matching preclusion number of a given graph is below a given threshold.

The strong matching preclusion number (or simply, SMP number) is a generalization of the matching preclusion number; the SMP number of a graph $G$, denoted $\mathrm{smp}(G)$, is the minimum number of vertices and/or edges whose deletion results in a graph that has neither perfect matchings nor almost-perfect matchings.

== Super matched graphs ==
A graph $G$ with an even number of vertices is called maximally matched if $\mathrm{mp}(G) = \delta(G)$, where $\delta(G)$ denotes the minimum degree. In such graphs, some trivial matching preclusion set (the edges incident to a vertex of minimum degree) is optimal. A graph is called super matched if every optimal matching preclusion set is trivial. Every super matched graph is maximally matched, but the converse is not necessarily true.

Being super matched is considered a desirable property for interconnection networks, as it indicates that in the event of random link failures, it is unlikely that all failed links will be incident to a single vertex. Hypercube graphs and their variants are known to be super matched.

== Graph products ==
The matching preclusion number can be bounded for graphs constructed using various graph product operations. For graphs $G$ and $H$ with an even number of vertices:

Cartesian product $G \square H$:

$$\mathrm{mp}(G) + \mathrm{mp}(H) \leq \mathrm{mp}(G \square H) \leq \delta(G) + \delta(H)$$

If both $G$ and $H$ are super matched, then $G \square H$ is super matched.

Strong product $G \boxtimes H$:

$$\mathrm{mp}(G)\mathrm{mp}(H) + \mathrm{mp}(G) + \mathrm{mp}(H) \leq \mathrm{mp}(G \boxtimes H) \leq \delta(G)\delta(H) + \delta(G) + \delta(H)$$

If both $G$ and $H$ are super matched with $\delta(G) \geq 2$ and $\delta(H) \geq 2$, then $G \boxtimes H$ is super matched.

Direct product $G \times H$:

$$\mathrm{mp}(G)\mathrm{mp}(H) \leq \mathrm{mp}(G \times H) \leq \delta(G)\delta(H)$$

If both $G$ and $H$ are super matched with $\delta(G) \geq 2$ and $\delta(H) \geq 2$, then $G \times H$ is super matched.

Lexicographic product $G \circ H$:

$$\mathrm{mp}(H) + \mathrm{mp}(G)|V(H)| \leq \mathrm{mp}(G \circ H) \leq \delta(H) + \delta(G)|V(H)|$$

If $G$ is maximally matched and $H$ is super matched with $\delta(H) \geq 2$, then $G \circ H$ is super matched.

For other binary graph operations such as the join, corona, and cluster operations, bounds on matching preclusion numbers have also been established, though these operations generally do not preserve the super matched property.

== Fractional matching preclusion ==
A fractional matching is a function $f$ that assigns to each edge a number in $[0,1]$ such that $\sum_{e \sim v} f(e) \leq 1$ for each vertex $v$, where the sum is taken over all edges incident with $v$. A fractional perfect matching is a fractional matching $f$ satisfying $\sum_{e \sim v} f(e) = 1$ for every vertex $v \in V(G)$. Clearly, a perfect matching is also a fractional perfect matching, but the converse is not necessarily true.

The fractional matching preclusion number of a graph $G$, denoted $\mathrm{fmp}(G)$, is the minimum number of edges whose deletion results in a graph that has no fractional perfect matching. For any graph $G$ of order $n$,

$$0 \leq \mathrm{fmp}(G) \leq n-1$$

with both bounds being sharp. For graphs with an even number of vertices, the fractional matching preclusion number is bounded by the ordinary matching preclusion number:

$$\mathrm{mp}(G) \leq \mathrm{fmp}(G) \leq \delta(G)$$

where $\delta(G)$ denotes the minimum degree. In particular, if $G$ is a graph with an even number of vertices and $\mathrm{mp}(G) = \delta(G)$, then $\mathrm{fmp}(G) = \mathrm{mp}(G) = \delta(G)$.

For complete graphs $K_n$ with $n \geq 7$, the fractional matching preclusion number equals $\mathrm{fmp}(K_n) = n-1$. More generally, for graphs with an even order $n \geq 4k+6$, $\mathrm{fmp}(G) = n-k$ if and only if $\delta(G) = n-k$.

== Integer k-matching preclusion ==
As a generalization of matching preclusion, the concept of integer $k$-matching preclusion extends the analysis to integer $k$-matchings. An integer $k$-matching of a graph $G$ is a function $h: E(G) \to {0, 1, \ldots, k}$ such that $\sum_{e \in \Gamma(v)} h(e) \leq k$ for any vertex $v \in V(G)$, where $\Gamma(v)$ denotes the set of edges incident with $v$. An integer $k$-matching is perfect if $\sum_{e \in \Gamma(v)} h(e) = k$ for each vertex $v$, and almost-perfect if there exists exactly one vertex $v'$ such that $\sum_{e \in \Gamma(v')} h(e) = k-1$ and all other vertices satisfy the perfect condition. Note that integer 1-matching coincides with the standard definition of matching.

The integer $k$-matching preclusion number, denoted $\mathrm{mp}_k(G)$, is the minimum number of edges whose deletion results in a graph that has neither a perfect nor an almost-perfect integer $k$-matching. The strong integer $k$-matching preclusion number, denoted $\mathrm{smp}_k(G)$, is the minimum number of vertices and/or edges whose deletion results in a graph that has neither a perfect nor an almost-perfect integer $k$-matching. By definition, $\mathrm{mp}_1(G) = \mathrm{mp}(G)$ and $\mathrm{smp}_1(G) = \mathrm{smp}(G)$.

For even values of $k$, the integer $k$-matching preclusion number equals the fractional matching preclusion number, since a graph has a perfect fractional matching if and only if it has a perfect integer $k$-matching when $k$ is even. Additionally, every graph has no almost-perfect integer $k$-matching for even $k$. Therefore, analysis typically focuses on odd values of $k \geq 3$.

=== Results for specific graph families ===
For complete graphs $K_n$ with $n \geq 6$,

$\mathrm{mp}_k(K_n) = \mathrm{smp}_k(K_n) = n-1$ for odd $k \geq 3$.

For smaller complete graphs, the values differ slightly:

$\mathrm{mp}_k(K_3) = \mathrm{smp}_k(K_3) = 1$, $\mathrm{mp}_k(K_4) = 3$ while $\mathrm{smp}_k(K_4) = 2$, and $\mathrm{mp}_k(K_5) = \mathrm{smp}_k(K_5) = 3$.

For bipartite graphs $G$, the relationship between integer $k$-matching and ordinary matching is particularly simple: the integer $k$-matching number equals $k$ times the matching number, i.e., $\mu_k(G) = k\mu(G)$. This implies that if $G$ is a bipartite graph with an odd number of vertices, then

$$\mathrm{mp}_k(G) = \mathrm{smp}_k(G) = 0$$,

while for even bipartite graphs,

$\mathrm{mp}_k(G) = \mathrm{mp}(G)$ and $\mathrm{smp}_k(G) \leq \mathrm{smp}(G)$.

For arrangement graphs $A_{n,s}$ (a class of interconnection network topologies), when $3 \leq s \leq n-2$, the strong integer $k$-matching preclusion number equals $\mathrm{smp}k(A{n,s}) = s(n-s)$, which is the minimum degree of the graph. For the special case $A_{n,2}$ with $n \geq 5$, $\mathrm{smp}k(A{n,2}) = 2n-4$.

== Related concepts ==
Other numbers defined in a similar way by edge deletion in an undirected graph include the edge connectivity, the minimum number of edges to delete in order to disconnect the graph, and the cyclomatic number, the minimum number of edges to delete in order to eliminate all cycles.
