= Fractional matching =

In graph theory, a fractional matching is a generalization of a matching in which, intuitively, each vertex may be broken into fractions that are matched to different neighbor vertices.

== Definition ==
Given a graph $G=(V,E)$, a fractional matching in $G$ is a function that assigns, to each edge $e\in E$, a fraction $f(e)\in[0,1]$, such that for every vertex $v\in V$, the sum of fractions of edges adjacent to $v$ is at most one:
$$\forall v\in V: \sum_{e\ni v}f(e)\leq 1$$
A matching in the traditional sense is a special case of a fractional matching, in which the fraction of every edge is either zero or one: $f(e)=1$ if $e$ is in the matching, and $f(e)=0$ if it is not. For this reason, in the context of fractional matchings, usual matchings are sometimes called integral matchings.

== Size ==
The size of an integral matching is the number of edges in the matching, and the matching number $\nu(G)$ of a graph $G$ is the largest size of a matching in $G$. Analogously, the size of a fractional matching is the sum of fractions of all edges. The fractional matching number of a graph $G$ is the largest size of a fractional matching in $G$. It is often denoted by $\nu^*(G)$. Since a matching is a special case of a fractional matching, the integral matching number of every graph $G$ is less than or equal to the fractional matching number of $G$; in symbols:
$$\nu(G) \leq \nu^*(G).$$
A graph in which $\nu(G) = \nu^*(G)$ is called a stable graph. Every bipartite graph is stable; this means that in every bipartite graph, the fractional matching number is an integer and it equals the integral matching number.

In an arbitrary graph, $\nu(G) \geq \tfrac{2}{3} \nu^*(G).$ The fractional matching number is either an integer or a half-integer.

== Matrix presentation ==
For a bipartite graph $G=(X,Y,E)$, a fractional matching can be presented as a matrix with $|X|$ rows and $|Y|$ columns. The value of the entry in row $x$ and column $y$ is the fraction of the edge $(x,y)$.

== Perfect fractional matching ==
A fractional matching is called perfect if the sum of weights adjacent to each vertex is exactly one. The size of a perfect matching is exactly $|V|/2$.

In a bipartite graph $G=(X,Y,E)$, a fractional matching is called $X$-perfect if the sum of weights adjacent to each vertex of $X$ is exactly one. The size of an $X$-perfect fractional matching is exactly $|X|$.

For a bipartite graph $G=(X,Y,E)$, the following are equivalent:

- $G$ admits an $X$-perfect integral matching,
- $G$ admits an $X$-perfect fractional matching, and
- $G$ satisfies the condition to Hall's marriage theorem.

The first condition implies the second because an integral matching is a fractional matching. The second implies the third because, for each subset $W\subset X$, the sum of weights incident to vertices of $W$ is $W$, so the edges adjacent to them are necessarily adjacent to at least $W$ vertices of $Y$. By Hall's marriage theorem, the last condition implies the first one.

In a general graph, the above conditions are not equivalent – the largest fractional matching can be larger than the largest integral matching. For example, a 3-cycle admits a perfect fractional matching of size $\tfrac32$ (the fraction of every edge is $\tfrac32$), but does not admit a perfect integral matching – its largest integral matching is of size one.

== Algorithmic aspects ==
A largest fractional matching in a graph can be found by linear programming, or alternatively by a maximum flow algorithm. In a bipartite graph, it is possible to convert a maximum fractional matching to a maximum integral matching of the same size. This leads to a polynomial-time algorithm for finding a maximum matching in a bipartite graph.

If $G=(X,Y,E)$ is a bipartite graph with $|X|=|Y|=n$, and $M$ is a perfect fractional matching, then the matrix representation of $M$ is a doubly stochastic matrix – the sum of elements in each row and each column is one. Birkhoff's algorithm can be used to decompose the matrix into a convex sum of at most $n^2-2n+2$ permutation matrices. This corresponds to decomposing $M$ into a convex combination of at most $n^2-2n+2$ perfect matchings.

=== Maximum-cardinality fractional matching ===
A fractional matching of maximum cardinality (i.e., maximum sum of fractions) can be found by linear programming. There is also a strongly-polynomial time algorithm, using augmenting paths, that runs in time $O(|V|\cdot|E|)$.

=== Maximum-weight fractional matching ===
Suppose each edge on the graph has a weight. A fractional matching of maximum weight in a graph can be found by linear programming. In a bipartite graph, it is possible to convert a maximum-weight fractional matching to a maximum-weight integral matching of the same size, in the following way:

- Let $f$ be the fractional matching.
- Let $H$ be a subgraph of $G$ containing only the edges $e$ with non-integral fraction, $0<f(e)<1$.
- If $H$ is empty, then $f$ already describes an integral matching.
- if $H$ has a cycle, then it must be even-length (since the graph is bipartite). One can construct a new fractional matching $f_1$ by transferring a small fraction $\varepsilon$ from edges in even positions around the cycle to edges in odd positions, and a new fractional matching $f_2$ by transferring $\varepsilon$ from odd edges to even edges. Since $f$ is the average of $f_1$ and $f_2$, the weight of $f$ is the average between the weight of $f_1$ and of $f_2$. Since $f$ has maximum weight, all three matchings must have the same weight. There exists a choice of $\varepsilon$ for which at least one of $f_1$ and $f_2$ has fewer edges with non-integral fraction. Continuing in the same way leads to an integral matching of the same weight.
- Supposing that $H$ has no cycle, let $P$ be a longest path in $H$. As above, one can construct two matchings $f_1$ and $f_2$ by transferring $\varepsilon$ from edges in even positions along the path to edges in odd positions, or vice versa. Because $P$ is a longest path, its endpoints have no other edges of $H$ incident to them, and any incident edges in $G\setminus H$ must have zero as their fraction, so this transfer cannot overload these vertices. Again $f_1$ and $f_2$ must have maximum weight, and at least one of them has fewer non-integral fractions.

== Fractional matching polytope ==
Given a graph $G=(V,E)$, the fractional matching polytope of $G$ is a convex polytope that represents all possible fractional matchings of $G$. It is a polytope in $\mathbb{R}^{|E|}$ – the $|E|$-dimensional Euclidean space. Each point $(x_1,\dots,x_{|E|})$ in the polytope represents a matching in which, for some numbering of the edges as $e_1,\dots,e_{|E|}$, the fraction of each edge is $f(e_i)=x_i$. This polytope is defined by $|E|$ non-negativity constraints ($x_i\ge 0$ for all $i=1,\dots,|E|$) and $|V|$ vertex constraints (the sum of $x_i$, for all edges $e_i$ that are adjacent to a vertex $v$, is at most one).

For a bipartite graph, this is the matching polytope, the convex hull of the points in $\mathbb{R}^{|E|}$ that correspond to integral matchings. Thus, in this case, the vertices of the polytope are all integral. For a non-bipartite graph, the fractional matching polytope is a superset of the matching polytope.

== See also ==
- Fractional coloring
