= Matching polytope =

Shape representing matchings in a graph

In graph theory, the matching polytope of a given graph is a geometric object representing the possible matchings in the graph. It is a convex polytope each of whose corners corresponds to a matching. It has great theoretical importance in the theory of matching.

== Preliminaries ==
=== Incidence vectors and matrices ===
Let G = (V, E) be a graph with n = |V| nodes and m = |E| edges.

For every subset U of vertices, its incidence vector 1_{U} is a vector of size n, in which element v is 1 if node v is in U, and 0 otherwise. Similarly, for every subset F of edges, its incidence vector 1_{F} is a vector of size m, in which element e is 1 if edge e is in F, and 0 otherwise.

For every node v in V, the set of edges in E adjacent to v is denoted by E(v). Therefore, each vector 1_{E(v)} is a 1-by-m vector in which element e is 1 if edge e is adjacent to v, and 0 otherwise. The incidence matrix of the graph, denoted by A_{G}, is an n-by-m matrix in which each row v is the incidence vector 1_{E(V)}. In other words, each element v,e in the matrix is 1 if node v is adjacent to edge e, and 0 otherwise.

Below are three examples of incidence matrices: the triangle graph (a cycle of length 3), a square graph (a cycle of length 4), and the complete graph on 4 vertices.

$$\begin{pmatrix}
1 & 1 & 0 \\
1 & 0 & 1 \\
0 & 1 & 1
\end{pmatrix}
~,~
\begin{pmatrix}
1 & 1 & 0 & 0 \\
0 & 1 & 1 & 0 \\
0 & 0 & 1 & 1 \\
1 & 0 & 0 & 1 \\
\end{pmatrix}
~,~
\begin{pmatrix}
1 & 1 & 0 & 0 & 1 & 0\\
0 & 1 & 1 & 0 & 0 & 1\\
0 & 0 & 1 & 1 & 1 & 0\\
1 & 0 & 0 & 1 & 0 & 1\\
\end{pmatrix}$$

=== Linear programs ===
For every subset F of edges, the dot product 1_{E(v)} · 1_{F} represents the number of edges in F that are adjacent to v. Therefore, the following statements are equivalent:

- A subset F of edges represents a matching in G;
- For every node v in V: 1_{E(v)} · 1_{F} ≤ 1.
- A_{G} · 1_{F} ≤ 1_{V}.

The cardinality of a set F of edges is the dot product 1_{E} · 1_{F} _{.} Therefore, a maximum cardinality matching in G is given by the following integer linear program:

Maximize 1_{E} · x

Subject to: x in {0,1}^{m}

__________ A_{G} · x ≤ 1_{V}.

== Fractional matching polytope ==
The fractional matching polytope of a graph G, denoted FMP(G), is the polytope defined by the relaxation of the above linear program, in which each x may be a fraction and not just an integer:

Maximize 1_{E} · x

Subject to: x ≥ 0_{E}

__________ A_{G} · x ≤ 1_{V}.

This is a linear program. It has m "at-least-0" constraints and n "less-than-one" constraints. The set of its feasible solutions is a convex polytope. Each point in this polytope is a fractional matching. For example, in the triangle graph there are 3 edges, and the corresponding linear program has the following 6 constraints:

Maximize x_{1}+x_{2}+x_{3}

Subject to: x_{1}≥0, x_{2}≥0, x_{3}≥0_{.}

__________ x_{1}+x_{2}≤1, x_{2}+x_{3}≤1, x_{3}+x_{1}≤1.

This set of inequalities represents a polytope in R^{3} - the 3-dimensional Euclidean space.

The polytope has five corners (extreme points). These are the points that attain equality in 3 out of the 6 defining inequalities. The corners are (0,0,0), (1,0,0), (0,1,0), (0,0,1), and (1/2,1/2,1/2). The first corner (0,0,0) represents the trivial (empty) matching. The next three corners (1,0,0), (0,1,0), (0,0,1) represent the three matchings of size 1. The fifth corner (1/2,1/2,1/2) does not represent a matching - it represents a fractional matching in which each edge is "half in, half out". Note that this is the largest fractional matching in this graph - its weight is 3/2, in contrast to the three integral matchings whose size is only 1.

As another example, in the 4-cycle there are 4 edges. The corresponding LP has 4+4=8 constraints. The FMP is a convex polytope in R^{4}. The corners of this polytope are (0,0,0,0), (1,0,0,0), (0,1,0,0), (0,0,1,0), (0,0,0,1), (1,0,1,0), (0,1,0,1). Each of the last 2 corners represents matching of size 2, which is a maximum matching. Note that in this case all corners have integer coordinates.

== Integral matching polytope ==
The integral matching polytope (usually called just the matching polytope) of a graph G, denoted MP(G), is a polytope whose corners are the incidence vectors of the integral matchings in G.

MP(G) is always contained in FMP(G). In the above examples:

- The MP of the triangle graph is strictly contained in its FMP, since the MP does not contain the non-integral corner (1/2, 1/2, 1/2).
- The MP of the 4-cycle graph is identical to its FMP, since all the corners of the FMP are integral.

== The matching polytopes in a bipartite graph ==
The above example is a special case of the following general theorem:

G is a bipartite graph if-and-only-if MP(G) = FMP(G) if-and-only-if all corners of FMP(G) have only integer coordinates.

This theorem can be proved in several ways.

=== Proof using matrices ===
When G is bipartite, its incidence matrix A_{G} is totally unimodular - every square submatrix of it has determinant 0, +1 or −1. The proof is by induction on k - the size of the submatrix (which we denote by K). The base k = 1 follows from the definition of A_{G} - every element in it is either 0 or 1. For k>1 there are several cases:

- If K has a column consisting only of zeros, then det K = 0.
- If K has a column with a single 1, then det K can be expanded about this column and it equals either +1 or -1 times a determinant of a (k − 1) by (k − 1) matrix, which by the induction assumption is 0 or +1 or −1.
- Otherwise, each column in K has two 1s. Since the graph is bipartite, the rows can be partitioned into two subsets, such that in each column, one 1 is in the top subset and the other 1 is in the bottom subset. This means that the sum of the top subset and the sum of the bottom subset are both equal to 1_{E} minus a vector of |E| ones. This means that the rows of K are linearly dependent, so det K = 0.

As an example, in the 4-cycle (which is bipartite), the det A_{G} = 1. In contrast, in the 3-cycle (which is not bipartite), det A_{G} = 2.

Each corner of FMP(G) satisfies a set of m linearly-independent inequalities with equality. Therefore, to calculate the corner coordinates we have to solve a system of equations defined by a square submatrix of A_{G}. By Cramer's rule, the solution is a rational number in which the denominator is the determinant of this submatrix. This determinant must by +1 or −1; therefore the solution is an integer vector. Therefore all corner coordinates are integers.

By the n "less-than-one" constraints, the corner coordinates are either 0 or 1; therefore each corner is the incidence vector of an integral matching in G. Hence FMP(G) = MP(G).

== The facets of the matching polytope ==
A facet of a polytope is the set of its points which satisfy an essential defining inequality of the polytope with equality. If the polytope is d-dimensional, then its facets are (d − 1)-dimensional. For any graph G, the facets of MP(G) are given by the following inequalities:

- x ≥ 0_{E}
- 1_{E(v)} · x ≤ 1 (where v is a non-isolated vertex such that, if v has only one neighbor u, then {u,v} is a connected component of G, and if v has exactly two neighbors, then they are not adjacent).
- 1_{E(S)} · x ≤ (|S| − 1)/2 (where S spans a 2-connected factor-critical subgraph.)

== Perfect matching polytope ==
The perfect matching polytope of a graph G, denoted PMP(G), is a polytope whose corners are the incidence vectors of the integral perfect matchings in G. Obviously, PMP(G) is contained in MP(G); In fact, PMP(G) is the face of MP(G) determined by the equality:

1_{E} · x = n/2.

Edmonds proved that, for every graph G, PMP(G) can be described by the following constraints:

1_{E(v)} · x = 1 for all v in V (-- exactly one edge adjacent to v is in the matching)

1_{E(W)} · x ≥ 1 for every subset W of V with |W| odd (-- at least one edge should connect W to V\W). These constraints are called odd cut constraints.

x ≥ 0_{E}

Using this characterization and Farkas lemma, it is possible to obtain a good characterization of graphs having a perfect matching. By solving algorithmic problems on convex sets, one can find a minimum-weight perfect matching.

== See also ==
- Stable matching polytope
