= Nathan Mendelsohn =

American mathematician

Nathan Saul Mendelsohn, CM FRSC (April 14, 1917 – July 4, 2006) was an American-born mathematician who lived and worked in Canada. Mendelsohn was a researcher in several areas of discrete mathematics, including group theory and combinatorics.

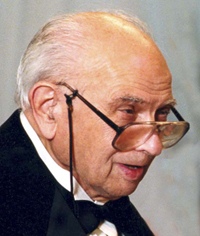
Nathan Mendelsohn (1999)

== Early life and education ==
Mendelsohn was born in 1917 in Brooklyn, New York City, the eldest of four children of Samuel Mendelsohn (1880–1959) and Sylvia, née Kirschenbaum (1895–1984). His paternal grandparents, Hyman Mendelsohn (1846–1928) and Hinda, née Silverstone (1859–1942) had originally immigrated to Montreal from Romania in 1898. His uncle was noted open water swimmer, Shier Mendelson. In 1918, he and his family moved to Toronto, Ontario, Canada, after a fire destroyed the tenement they were living in. Mendelsohn and his family lived in a house at 13 Euclid Avenue.

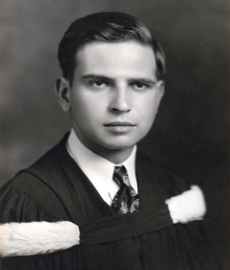
Nathan Mendelsohn (1939)

Mendelsohn completed all his education at the University of Toronto. He would have been unable to attend university had he not won a four years' tuition and books scholarship. In 1938, he was on the University of Toronto team for the first Putnam Competition, along with Irving Kaplansky and John Coleman. The team placed first and each of the three team members won fifty dollars. Mendelsohn was a junior, the other two were seniors. The subsequent year Mendelsohn was barred from competition as at that time the winning university set the examination for the next year and its students were barred from competition. Mendelsohn completed his Ph.D. dissertation in 1941. It was titled "A Group-Theoretic Characterization of the General Projective Collineation Group", and summarized in the Proceedings of the National Academy of Sciences in 1944. His supervisor was Gilbert de Beauregard Robinson.

Mendelsohn also began practising magic tricks in high school as a means of steadying a tremor in his hands. He placed second in the 1953 International Brotherhood of Magicians contest, behind Johnny Carson. He could memorize a shuffled deck of cards seeing each card only once briefly, or a list of fifty objects called out in any order. He could identify the position of each card or name the card in any position.

== Career ==
During the Second World War, Mendelsohn worked on simulations of artillery and code breaking. As with much of the mathematical work for military purposes during the time, it was classified. Although others related after fifty years what their exact role was, Nathan Mendelsohn strictly followed the Official Secrets Act and never revealed exact details of what he had done. We now know that when Norway fell to the Nazis, he worked on a team recomputing ballistics tables for Canadian wood as TNT is made from wood.

Then he went on to break code at Camp X, which was Canada’s equivalent of Bletchley Park.

From 1945 to 1947, Mendelsohn was a professor at Queen's University in Kingston, Ontario, Canada. Mendelsohn's son later remarked that Mendelsohn "understood that, as a Jew, he would never get a permanent position" at Queen's, as the university "already had a Jewish professor in the department."

In 1947, Mendelsohn moved to the University of Manitoba in Winnipeg, Manitoba. Mendelsohn stayed at the University of Manitoba until his retirement in 2005.

During early summers at the University of Manitoba, Mendelsohn would travel to Quebec City to teach to supplement his $3,000 annual salary at the University of Manitoba. In 1958, Mendelsohn and Dulmage published the paper "Coverings of biparte graphs", in which the Dulmage–Mendelsohn decomposition is described. Mendelsohn is also remembered for Mendelsohn triple systems.

Mendelsohn was head of the department of mathematics at the University of Manitoba for almost a quarter of a century.

In the early 1960s, Mendelsohn returned to classified mathematics, this time at the RAND Corporation. From 1969 to 1971, Mendelsohn was the president of the Canadian Mathematical Society.

In 1985, Mendelsohn was the subject of a short film form the National Film Board of Canada, titled "An Aesthetic Indulgence".

== Retirement ==
Mendelsohn retired from the University of Manitoba in 2005. He died on July 4, 2006, from hepatitis C obtained through tainted blood.

== Awards ==
In 1957, Mendelsohn was made a fellow of the Royal Society of Canada. He won the Henry Marshall Tory Medal in 1979.

On April 15, 1999, Mendelsohn was made a member of the Order of Canada. His citation reads, in part, that Mendelsohn is "known throughout the world as an authority in combinatorics, classical geometry and finite groups".

== Nathan Mendelsohn Prize ==
In 2008 the Nathan Mendelsohn Prize was established by his family at the University of Manitoba for the highest ranking student at a Canadian University in Putnam Competition.
