= Jenő Egerváry =

Hungarian mathematician

- Born: April 16, 1891; Debrecen, Hungary
- Died: November 30, 1958 (aged 67); Budapest, Hungary
- Education: University of Pázmány Péter
- Known for: Kőnig–Egerváry theorem
- Awards: Gyula Kőnig Prize (1932), Kossuth Prize (1949)
- Scientific career
- Fields: Mathematician
- Doctoral advisor: Leopold Fejér

Jenő Elek Egerváry (April 16, 1891 – November 30, 1958) was a Hungarian mathematician.

== Biography ==
Egerváry was born in Debrecen in 1891. In 1914, he received his doctorate at the Pázmány Péter University in Budapest, where he studied under the supervision of Lipót Fejér. He then worked as an assistant at the Seismological Observatory in Budapest, and since 1918 as a professor at the Superior Industrial School in Budapest. In 1938 he was appointed Privatdozent at the Pázmány Péter University in Budapest.

In 1941 he became a full professor at the Technical University of Budapest, and in 1950 he was appointed Chairman of the Scientific Council of the Research Institute for Applied Mathematics of the Hungarian Academy of Sciences.

Egerváry received the Gyula Kőnig Prize in 1932 and the Kossuth Prize in 1949 and 1953.

He committed suicide in 1958 because of the troubles caused to him by the communist bureaucracy.

== Works ==
Egerváry's interests spanned the theory of algebraic equations, geometry, differential equations, and matrix theory.

In what later became a classic result in the field of combinatorial optimization, Egerváry generalized Kőnig's theorem to the case of weighted graphs. This contribution was translated and published in 1955 by Harold W. Kuhn, who also showed how to apply Kőnig's and Egerváry's method to solve the assignment problem; the resulting algorithm has since been known as the "Hungarian method".

== See also ==
- Kőnig–Egerváry theorem
