= Tibor Gallai =

Hungarian mathematician (1912–1992)

- Born: 15 July 1912; Budapest, Hungary
- Died: 2 January 1992 (aged 79); Budapest, Hungary
- Education: Technical University of Budapest
- Known for: Sylvester–Gallai theorem
- Scientific career
- Fields: Mathematics
- Workplaces: Eötvös Loránd University
- Doctoral advisor: Dénes Kőnig
- Doctoral students: László Lovász

Tibor Gallai (born Tibor Grünwald, 15 July 1912 – 2 January 1992) was a Hungarian mathematician. He worked in combinatorics, especially in graph theory, and was a lifelong friend and collaborator of Paul Erdős. He was a student of Dénes Kőnig and an advisor of László Lovász. He was a corresponding member of the Hungarian Academy of Sciences (1991).

== His main results ==
The Edmonds–Gallai decomposition theorem, which was proved independently by Gallai and Jack Edmonds, describes finite graphs from the point of view of matchings. Gallai also proved, with Milgram, Dilworth's theorem in 1947, but as they hesitated to publish the result, Dilworth independently discovered and published it.

Gallai was the first to prove the higher-dimensional version of van der Waerden's theorem.

With Paul Erdős he gave a necessary and sufficient condition for a sequence to be the degree sequence of a graph, known as the Erdős–Gallai theorem.

== See also ==
- Gallai–Hasse–Roy–Vitaver theorem
- Sylvester–Gallai theorem
- Gallais-Edmonds decomposition
