= Meral Özsoyoglu =

Turkish-American computer scientist

Zehra Meral Özsoyoglu is a Turkish-American computer scientist specializing in databases, including research on query languages, database model, and indexes, and applications of databases in science, bioinformatics, and medical informatics. She is the Andrew R. Jennings Professor Emeritus of Computer Science at Case Western Reserve University.

== Education and career ==
Özsoyoglu earned bachelor's and master's degrees from Middle East Technical University in Ankara before moving to the University of Alberta in Edmonton, Canada for her doctoral studies. Her 1980 dissertation, Distributed Database Query Optimization Using Semi-Joins, was supervised by Clement T. Yu.

She was one of the authors of the GYO algorithm to test acyclicity of hypergraphs.

She joined the faculty at Case Western Reserve University in 1980, becoming the first female faculty member in her department and the second in the engineering school. She also became the first female chair of her department.

She was editor-in-chief for ACM Transactions on Database Systems from 2007 to 2014, the first female editor-in-chief of the journal, and the editor-in-chief of the Proceedings of the VLDB Endowment for 2011–2012. She has also served as program chair for four database conferences.

== Recognition ==
Özsoyoglu was named a Fellow of the Association for Computing Machinery in 2011 "for contributions to database management systems". In 2018 she won the 2018 ACM SIGMOD Contributions Award "for dedicated service to the database community". The award cited her service as editor-in-chief for ACM Transactions on Database Systems and the Proceedings of the VLDB Endowment and as program committee chair for the VLDB conference and the Symposium on Principles of Database Systems.
