= Martin H. Graham =

Martin H. Graham (July 12, 1926 – May 12, 2015) was an American professor at the Electrical Engineering and Computer Science Department (EECS) of the University of California at Berkeley.

== Biography ==
Martin Graham was born in Jamaica, Queens, in 1926. At the age of 16 he enrolled as a freshman at the Polytechnic Institute of Brooklyn, New York. Then, he served in the U.S. Navy as an electronic technician mate from 1944 to 1946. After completing service in the U.S. Navy, he studied electrical engineering under the GI Bill and became an instructor at the Polytechnic Institute of Brooklyn. In 1948, he received a M.Sc. degree from Harvard University. He returned to the Polytechnic Institute of Brooklyn, where he received his Ph.D. in 1952. After working at the Brookhaven National Laboratory as an engineer, he began an academic appointment at Rice University in 1957, eventually rising to the rank of professor of electrical engineering and director of the Computer Project. He left Rice in 1966 and was appointed professor of electrical engineering at UC Berkeley that same year. He served as associate director of the Computer Center from 1966 to 1968, and chair of the Computer Science Department from 1970 to 1973. He also served as secretary of the Academic Senate from 1978 to 1980. He retired in 1993 but continued working from his office at Cory Hall on the UC Berkeley campus. Graham died in 2015.

== Scientific work ==
At the Brookhaven National Laboratory, Graham was a member of a team building an improved version of the Los Alamos MANIAC computer. Then, Graham became best known as project leader of the Rice Institute Computer R1 in Houston, Texas. At the time, he was mainly system- and hardware-oriented, drawing from his practical experience as an electronics technician and engineer. Graham changed his research focus in the 1960s while working at UC Berkeley from computer communications to the general areas of biomedical instrumentation. He participated in the establishment of a bioelectronics program at the EECS department. This effort evolved further as a joint program for biomedical engineering together with the University of California, San Francisco. Publications in this field concern electrocardiograms or the galvanic skin reflex, but also of data transmission techniques. Numerous patents and publications resulted.

Graham is also cited as the co-inventor of the GYO algorithm to test if a hypergraph is acyclic.
