= Conflict-free coloring =

Generalization of graph coloring to the hypergraph

A conflict-free coloring of the hypergraph using as few colors as possible. The third color is required, because if edges 1 and 2 are each colored with the same two colors, edge 3 will necessarily contain two of each color.

Conflict-free coloring is a generalization of the notion of graph coloring to hypergraphs.

== Definition ==
A hypergraph H has a vertex-set V and an edge-set E. Each edge is a subset of vertices (in a graph, each edge contains at most two vertices, but in a hypergraph, it may contain more than two).

A coloring is an assignment of a color to each vertex of V.

A coloring is conflict-free if at least one vertex in each edge has a unique color. If H is a graph, then this condition becomes the standard condition for a legal coloring of a graph: the two vertices adjacent to every edge should have different colors.

== Applications ==
Conflict-free colorings arise in the context of assigning frequency bands to cellular antennae, in battery consumption aspects of sensor networks and in RFID protocols.

== Special cases ==
A common special case is when the vertices are points in the plane, and the edges are subsets of points contained in the same disk. In this setting, a coloring of the points is called conflict-free if, for every closed disk D containing at least one point from the set, there is a color that occurs precisely once. Any conflict-free coloring of every set of n points in the plane uses at least c log n colors, for an absolute constant c > 0. The same is true not only for disks but also for homothetic copies of any convex body.

Another special case is when the vertices are vertices of a graph, and the edges are sets of neighbors. In this setting, a coloring of the vertices is called conflict-free if, for every vertex v, there is a color that is assigned to exactly one vertex among v and its neighbors. In this setting, the conflict-free variant of the Hadwiger Conjecture holds: If a graph G does not contain K_{k}_{+1} as a minor, then it has a conflict-free coloring with at most k colors. For planar graphs, three colors are sometimes necessary and always sufficient for a conflict-free coloring. It is NP-complete to decide whether a planar graph has a conflict-free coloring with one color, and whether a planar graph has a conflict-free coloring with two colors.

When the hypergraph's edges all contain 3 vertices (a 3-uniform hypergraph), it can be 2-colored if and only if it has Property B. Consider an edge containing 3 vertices, and color the vertices with exactly 2 colors. There will always be a single vertex with one of the two colors.
