= Combinatorial design =

Symmetric arrangement of finite sets

Combinatorial design theory is the part of combinatorial mathematics that deals with the existence, construction and properties of systems of finite sets whose arrangements satisfy generalized concepts of balance or symmetry. These concepts are not made precise so that a wide range of objects can be thought of as being under the same umbrella. At times this might involve the numerical sizes of set intersections as in block designs, while at other times it could involve the spatial arrangement of entries in an array as in sudoku grids.

Combinatorial design theory can be applied to the area of design of experiments. Some of the basic theory of combinatorial designs originated in the statistician Ronald Fisher's work on the design of biological experiments. Modern applications are also found in a wide gamut of areas including finite geometry, tournament scheduling, lotteries, mathematical chemistry, mathematical biology, algorithm design and analysis, networking, group testing and cryptography.

== Example ==
The Fano plane

Given a certain number n of people, is it possible to assign them to sets so that each person is in at least one set, each pair of people is in exactly one set together, every two sets have exactly one person in common, and no set contains everyone, all but one person, or exactly one person? The answer depends on n.

This has a solution only if n has the form q^{2} + q + 1. It is less simple to prove that a solution exists if q is a prime power. It is conjectured that these are the only solutions. It has been further shown that if a solution exists for q congruent to 1 or 2 mod 4, then q is a sum of two square numbers. This last result, the Bruck–Ryser theorem, is proved by a combination of constructive methods based on finite fields and an application of quadratic forms.

When such a structure does exist, it is called a finite projective plane; thus showing how finite geometry and combinatorics intersect. When q = 2, the projective plane is called the Fano plane.

== History ==
Combinatorial designs date to antiquity, with the Lo Shu Square being an early magic square. One of the earliest datable application of combinatorial design is found in India in the book Brhat Samhita by Varahamihira, written around 587 AD, for the purpose of making perfumes using 4 substances selected from 16 different substances using a magic square.

Combinatorial designs developed along with the general growth of combinatorics from the 18th century, for example with Latin squares in the 18th century and Steiner systems in the 19th century. Designs have also been popular in recreational mathematics, such as Kirkman's schoolgirl problem (1850), and in practical problems, such as the scheduling of round-robin tournaments (solution published 1880s). In the 20th century designs were applied to the design of experiments, notably Latin squares, finite geometry, and association schemes, yielding the field of algebraic statistics.

== Fundamental combinatorial designs ==
The classical core of the subject of combinatorial designs is built around balanced incomplete block designs (BIBDs), Hadamard matrices and Hadamard designs, symmetric BIBDs, Latin squares, resolvable BIBDs, difference sets, and pairwise balanced designs (PBDs). Other combinatorial designs are related to or have been developed from the study of these fundamental ones.

- A balanced incomplete block design or BIBD (usually called for short a block design) is a collection B of b subsets (called blocks) of a finite set X of v elements, such that any element of X is contained in the same number r of blocks, every block has the same number k of elements, and each pair of distinct elements appear together in the same number λ of blocks. BIBDs are also known as 2-designs and are often denoted as 2-(v,k,λ) designs. As an example, when λ = 1 and b = v, we have a projective plane: X is the point set of the plane and the blocks are the lines.
- A symmetric balanced incomplete block design or SBIBD is a BIBD in which v = b (the number of points equals the number of blocks). They are the single most important and well studied subclass of BIBDs. Projective planes, biplanes and Hadamard 2-designs are all SBIBDs. They are of particular interest since they are the extremal examples of Fisher's inequality (b ≥ v).
- A resolvable BIBD is a BIBD whose blocks can be partitioned into sets (called parallel classes), each of which forms a partition of the point set of the BIBD. The set of parallel classes is called a resolution of the design. A solution of the famous 15 schoolgirl problem is a resolution of a BIBD with v = 15, k = 3 and λ = 1.
- A Latin rectangle is an r × n matrix that has the numbers 1, 2, 3, ..., n as its entries (or any other set of n distinct symbols) with no number occurring more than once in any row or column where r ≤ n. An n × n Latin rectangle is called a Latin square. If r < n, then it is possible to append n − r rows to an r × n Latin rectangle to form a Latin square, using Hall's marriage theorem.

Two Latin squares of order n are said to be orthogonal if the set of all ordered pairs consisting of the corresponding entries in the two squares has n^{2} distinct members (all possible ordered pairs occur). A set of Latin squares of the same order forms a set of mutually orthogonal Latin squares (MOLS) if every pair of Latin squares in the set are orthogonal. There can be at most n − 1 squares in a set of MOLS of order n. A set of n − 1 MOLS of order n can be used to construct a projective plane of order n (and conversely).

- A (v, k, λ) difference set is a subset D of a group G such that the order of G is v, the size of D is k, and every nonidentity element of G can be expressed as a product d_{1}d_{2}^{−1} of elements of D in exactly λ ways (when G is written with a multiplicative operation).

If D is a difference set, and g in G, then g D = {gd: d in D} is also a difference set, and is called a translate of D. The set of all translates of a difference set D forms a symmetric BIBD. In such a design there are v elements and v blocks. Each block of the design consists of k points, each point is contained in k blocks. Any two blocks have exactly λ elements in common and any two points appear together in λ blocks. This SBIBD is called the development of D.

In particular, if λ = 1, then the difference set gives rise to a projective plane. An example of a (7,3,1) difference set in the group $\mathbb{Z}/7\mathbb{Z}$ (an abelian group written additively) is the subset {1,2,4}. The development of this difference set gives the Fano plane.
Since every difference set gives an SBIBD, the parameter set must satisfy the Bruck–Ryser–Chowla theorem, but not every SBIBD gives a difference set.

- An Hadamard matrix of order m is an m × m matrix H whose entries are ±1 such that HH^{⊤} = mI_{m}, where H^{⊤} is the transpose of H and I_{m} is the m × m identity matrix. An Hadamard matrix can be put into standardized form (that is, converted to an equivalent Hadamard matrix) where the first row and first column entries are all +1. If the order m > 2 then m must be a multiple of 4.

Given an Hadamard matrix of order 4a in standardized form, remove the first row and first column and convert every −1 to a 0. The resulting 0–1 matrix M is the incidence matrix of a symmetric 2-(4a − 1, 2a − 1, a − 1) design called an Hadamard 2-design. This construction is reversible, and the incidence matrix of a symmetric 2-design with these parameters can be used to form an Hadamard matrix of order 4a. When a = 2 we obtain the, by now familiar, Fano plane as an Hadamard 2-design.

- A pairwise balanced design (or PBD) is a set X together with a family of subsets of X (which need not have the same size and may contain repeats) such that every pair of distinct elements of X is contained in exactly λ (a positive integer) subsets. The set X is allowed to be one of the subsets, and if all the subsets are copies of X, the PBD is called trivial. The size of X is v and the number of subsets in the family (counted with multiplicity) is b.

Fisher's inequality holds for PBDs: For any non-trivial PBD, v ≤ b.

This result also generalizes the famous Erdős–De Bruijn theorem: For a PBD with λ = 1 having no blocks of size 1 or size v, v ≤ b, with equality if and only if the PBD is a projective plane or a near-pencil.

== Other combinatorial designs ==
The Handbook of Combinatorial Designs (Colbourn & Dinitz 2007) has, amongst others, 65 chapters, each devoted to a combinatorial design other than those given above. A partial listing is given below:

- Association schemes
- A balanced ternary design BTD(V, B; ρ_{1}, ρ_{2}, R; K, Λ) is an arrangement of V elements into B multisets (blocks), each of cardinality K (K ≤ V), satisfying:
1. Each element appears R = ρ_{1} + 2ρ_{2} times altogether, with multiplicity one in exactly ρ_{1} blocks and multiplicity two in exactly ρ_{2} blocks.
2. Every pair of distinct elements appears Λ times (counted with multiplicity); that is, if m_{vb} is the multiplicity of the element v in block b, then for every pair of distinct elements v and w, $\sum_{b=1}^B m_{vb} m_{wb} = \Lambda$.

For example, one of the only two nonisomorphic BTD(4,8;2,3,8;4,6)s (blocks are columns) is:

1	1	1	2	2	3	1	1
1	1	1	2	2	3	2	2
2	3	4	3	4	4	3	3
2	3	4	3	4	4	4	4

The incidence matrix of a BTD (where the entries are the multiplicities of the elements in the blocks) can be used to form a ternary error-correcting code analogous to the way binary codes are formed from the incidence matrices of BIBDs.

- A balanced tournament design of order n (a BTD(n)) is an arrangement of all the distinct unordered pairs of a 2n-set V into an n × (2n − 1) array such that
1. every element of V appears precisely once in each column, and
2. every element of V appears at most twice in each row.

An example of a BTD(3) is given by

1 6	3 5	2 3	4 5	2 4
2 5	4 6	1 4	1 3	3 6
3 4	1 2	5 6	2 6	1 5

The columns of a BTD(n) provide a 1-factorization of the complete graph on 2n vertices, K_{2n}.
BTD(n)s can be used to schedule round-robin tournaments: the rows represent the locations, the columns the rounds of play and the entries are the competing players or teams.

- Bent functions
- Costas arrays
- Covering designs
- Factorial designs
- A frequency square (F-square) is a higher order generalization of a Latin square. Let S = {s_{1},s_{2}, ..., s_{m}} be a set of distinct symbols and (λ_{1}, λ_{2}, ...,λ_{m}) a frequency vector of positive integers. A frequency square of order n is an n × n array in which each symbol s_{i} occurs λ_{i} times, i = 1,2,...,m, in each row and column. The order n = λ_{1} + λ_{2} + ... + λ_{m}. An F-square is in standard form if in the first row and column, all occurrences of s_{i} precede those of s_{j} whenever i < j.

A frequency square F_{1} of order n based on the set {s_{1},s_{2}, ..., s_{m}} with frequency vector (λ_{1}, λ_{2}, ...,λ_{m}) and a frequency square F_{2}, also of order n, based on the set {t_{1},t_{2}, ..., t_{k}} with frequency vector (μ_{1}, μ_{2}, ...,μ_{k}) are orthogonal if every ordered pair (s_{i}, t_{j}) appears precisely λ_{i}μ_{j} times when F_{1} and F_{2} are superimposed.

- Hall triple systems (HTSs) are Steiner triple systems (STSs) (but the blocks are called lines) with the property that the substructure generated by two intersecting lines is isomorphic to the finite affine plane AG(2,3).

Any affine space AG(n,3) gives an example of an HTS. Such an HTS is an affine HTS. Nonaffine HTSs also exist.
The number of points of an HTS is 3^{m} for some integer m ≥ 2. Nonaffine HTSs exist for any m ≥ 4 and do not exist for m = 2 or 3.
Every Steiner triple system is equivalent to a Steiner quasigroup (idempotent, commutative and satisfying (xy)y = x for all x and y). A Hall triple system is equivalent to a Steiner quasigroup which is distributive, that is, satisfies a(xy) = (ax)(ay) for all a,x,y in the quasigroup.

- Let S be a set of 2n elements. A Howell design, H(s,2n) (on symbol set S) is an s × s array such that:
1. Each cell of the array is either empty or contains an unordered pair from S,
2. Each symbol occurs exactly once in each row and column of the array, and
3. Every unordered pair of symbols occurs in at most one cell of the array.

An example of an H(4,6) is

0 4		1 3	2 5
2 3	1 4	0 5	
	3 5	2 4	0 1
1 5	0 2		3 4

An H(2n − 1, 2n) is a Room square of side 2n − 1, and thus the Howell designs generalize the concept of Room squares.

The pairs of symbols in the cells of a Howell design can be thought of as the edges of an s regular graph on 2n vertices, called the underlying graph of the Howell design.

Cyclic Howell designs are used as Howell movements in duplicate bridge tournaments. The rows of the design represent the rounds, the columns represent the boards, and the diagonals represent the tables.

- Linear spaces
- An (n,k,p,t)-lotto design is an n-set V of elements together with a set β of k-element subsets of V (blocks), so that for any p-subset P of V, there is a block B in β for which |P ∩ B | ≥ t. L(n,k,p,t) denotes the smallest number of blocks in any (n,k,p,t)-lotto design. The following is a (7,5,4,3)-lotto design with the smallest possible number of blocks:

{1,2,3,4,7} {1,2,5,6,7} {3,4,5,6,7}.

Lotto designs model any lottery that is run in the following way: Individuals purchase tickets consisting of k numbers chosen from a set of n numbers. At a certain point the sale of tickets is stopped and a set of p numbers is randomly selected from the n numbers. These are the winning numbers. If any sold ticket contains t or more of the winning numbers, a prize is given to the ticket holder. Larger prizes go to tickets with more matches. The value of L(n,k,p,t) is of interest to both gamblers and researchers, as this is the smallest number of tickets that are needed to be purchased in order to guarantee a prize.

The Hungarian Lottery is a (90,5,5,t)-lotto design and it is known that L(90,5,5,2) = 100. Lotteries with parameters (49,6,6,t) are also popular worldwide and it is known that L(49,6,6,2) = 19. In general though, these numbers are hard to calculate and remain unknown.

A geometric construction of one such design is given in Transylvanian lottery.

- Magic squares
- A (v,k,λ)-Mendelsohn design, or MD(v,k,λ), is a v-set V and a collection β of ordered k-tuples of distinct elements of V (called blocks), such that each ordered pair (x,y) with x ≠ y of elements of V is cyclically adjacent in λ blocks. The ordered pair (x,y) of distinct elements is cyclically adjacent in a block if the elements appear in the block as (...,x,y,...) or (y,...,x). An MD(v,3,λ) is a Mendelsohn triple system, MTS(v,λ). An example of an MTS(4,1) on V = {0,1,2,3} is:

(0,1,2) (1,0,3) (2,1,3) (0,2,3)

Any triple system can be made into a Mendelson triple system by replacing the unordered triple {a,b,c} with the pair of ordered triples (a,b,c) and (a,c,b), but as the example shows, the converse of this statement is not true.
If (Q,∗) is an idempotent semisymmetric quasigroup, that is, x ∗ x = x (idempotent) and x ∗ (y ∗ x) = y (semisymmetric) for all x, y in Q, let β = {(x,y,x ∗ y): x, y in Q}. Then (Q, β) is a Mendelsohn triple system MTS(|Q|,1). This construction is reversible.

- Orthogonal arrays
- Packing designs
- A quasi-3 design is a symmetric design (SBIBD) in which each triple of blocks intersect in either x or y points, for fixed x and y called the triple intersection numbers (x < y). Any symmetric design with λ ≤ 2 is a quasi-3 design with x = 0 and y = 1. The point-hyperplane design of PG(n,q) is a quasi-3 design with x = (q^{n−2} − 1)/(q − 1) and y = λ = (q^{n−1} − 1)/(q − 1). If y = λ for a quasi-3 design, the design is isomorphic to PG(n,q) or a projective plane.
- A t-(v,k,λ) design D is quasi-symmetric with intersection numbers x and y (x < y) if every two distinct blocks intersect in either x or y points. These designs naturally arise in the investigation of the duals of designs with λ = 1. A non-symmetric (b > v) 2-(v,k,1) design is quasisymmetric with x = 0 and y = 1. A multiple (repeat all blocks a certain number of times) of a symmetric 2-(v,k,λ) design is quasisymmetric with x = λ and y = k. Hadamard 3-designs (extensions of Hadamard 2-designs) are quasisymmetric.

Every quasisymmetric block design gives rise to a strongly regular graph (as its block graph), but not all SRGs arise in this way.
The incidence matrix of a quasisymmetric 2-(v,k,λ) design with k ≡ x ≡ y (mod 2) generates a binary self-orthogonal code (when bordered if k is odd).

- Room squares
- A spherical design is a finite set X of points in a (d − 1)-dimensional sphere such that, for some integer t, the average value on X of every polynomial

$$f(x_1, \ldots, x_d)\$$

of total degree at most t is equal to the average value of f on the whole sphere, i.e., the integral of f divided by the area of the sphere.

- Turán systems
- An r × n tuscan-k rectangle on n symbols has r rows and n columns such that:
1. each row is a permutation of the n symbols and
2. for any two distinct symbols a and b and for each m from 1 to k, there is at most one row in which b is m steps to the right of a.

If r = n and k = 1 these are referred to as Tuscan squares, while if r = n and k = n − 1 they are Florentine squares. A Roman square is a Tuscan square which is also a latin square (these are also known as row complete Latin squares). A Vatican square is a Florentine square which is also a Latin square.

The following example is a tuscan-1 square on 7 symbols which is not tuscan-2:

6	1	5	2	4	3	7
2	6	3	5	4	7	1
5	7	2	3	1	4	6
4	2	5	1	6	7	3
3	6	2	1	7	4	5
1	3	2	7	5	6	4
7	6	5	3	4	1	2

A tuscan square on n symbols is equivalent to a decomposition of the complete graph with n vertices into n hamiltonian directed paths.

In a sequence of visual impressions, one flash card may have some effect on the impression given by the next. This bias can be cancelled by using n sequences corresponding to the rows of an n × n tuscan-1 square.

- A t-wise balanced design (or t BD) of type t − (v,K,λ) is a v-set X together with a family of subsets of X (called blocks) whose sizes are in the set K, such that every t-subset of distinct elements of X is contained in exactly λ blocks. If K is a set of positive integers strictly between t and v, then the t BD is proper. If all the k-subsets of X for some k are blocks, the t BD is a trivial design.

Notice that in the following example of a 3-{12,{4,6},1) design based on the set X = {1,2,...,12}, some pairs appear four times (such as 1,2) while others appear five times (6,12 for instance).

1 2 3 4 5 6 1 2 7 8 1 2 9 11 1 2 10 12 3 5 7 8 3 5 9 11 3 5 10 12 4 6 7 8 4 6 9 11 4 6 10 12
7 8 9 10 11 12 2 3 8 9 2 3 10 7 2 3 11 12 4 1 8 9 4 1 10 7 4 1 11 12 5 6 8 9 5 6 10 7 5 6 11 12
3 4 9 10 3 4 11 8 3 4 7 12 5 2 9 10 5 2 11 8 5 2 7 12 1 6 9 10 1 6 11 8 1 6 7 12
4 5 10 11 4 5 7 9 4 5 8 12 1 3 10 11 1 3 7 9 1 3 8 12 2 6 10 11 2 6 7 9 2 6 8 12
5 1 11 7 5 1 8 10 5 1 9 12 2 4 11 7 2 4 8 10 2 4 9 12 3 6 11 7 3 6 8 10 3 6 9 12

- Weighing matrices, A generalization of Hadamard matrices that allows zero entries, are used in some combinatoric designs. In particular, the design of experiments for estimating the individual weights of multiple objects in few trials.
- A Youden square is a k × v rectangular array (k < v) of v symbols such that each symbol appears exactly once in each row and the symbols appearing in any column form a block of a symmetric (v, k, λ) design, all the blocks of which occur in this manner. A Youden square is a Latin rectangle. The term "square" in the name comes from an older definition which did use a square array. An example of a 4 × 7 Youden square is given by:

1	2	3	4	5	6	7
2	3	4	5	6	7	1
3	4	5	6	7	1	2
5	6	7	1	2	3	4

The seven blocks (columns) form the order 2 biplane (a symmetric (7,4,2)-design).

== See also ==
- Algebraic statistics
- Hypergraph
- Williamson conjecture
