= Set splitting problem =

Set splitting shown on a hypergraph. The vertices make up the set S, and the edges make up the family of subsets F. The vertices are colored such that every edge has at least one vertex of each color (in this case, red and green).

In computational complexity theory, the set splitting problem is the following decision problem: given a family F of subsets of a finite set S, decide whether there exists a partition of S into two subsets S_{1}, S_{2} such that all elements of F are split by this partition, i.e., none of the elements of F is completely in S_{1} or S_{2}. Set Splitting is one of Garey & Johnson's classical NP-complete problems. The problem is sometimes called hypergraph 2-colorability.

== Variants ==
Ek-set splitting, where k = 3. The "E" denotes that, on top of having k colors, each edge must contain exactly k vertices.

The optimization version of this problem is called max set splitting and requires finding the partition which maximizes the number of split elements of F. It is an APX-complete problem and hence in NPO.

The set k-splitting problem is stated as follows: given S, F, and an integer k, does there exist a partition of S which splits at least k subsets of F? The original formulation is the restricted case with k equal to the cardinality of F. The Set k-Splitting is fixed-parameter tractable, i.e., if k taken to be a fixed parameter, rather than a part of the input, then a polynomial algorithm exists for any fixed k. Dehne, Fellows and Rosamond presented an algorithm that solves it in time $O(f(k) n^c)$ for some function f and constant c.

When each element of F is restricted to be of cardinality exactly k, the decision variant is called Ek-set splitting and the optimization version max Ek-set splitting. For k > 2 the former remains NP complete, and for k ≥ 2 the latter remains APX complete. For k ≥ 4, Ek-Set Splitting is approximation resistant. That is, unless P=NP, there is no polynomial-time (factor) approximation algorithm which does essentially better than a random partition.

The weighted set splitting is a variant in which the subsets in F have weights and the objective is to maximize the total weight of the split subsets.

== Connection to other problems ==
Set splitting is special case of the not-all-equal satisfiability problem without negated variables. Additionally, Ek-set splitting equals non-monochromatic graph coloring of k-uniform hypergraphs. For k=2, the optimization variant reduces to the well-known maximum cut.
