= R. H. Bruck =

American mathematician

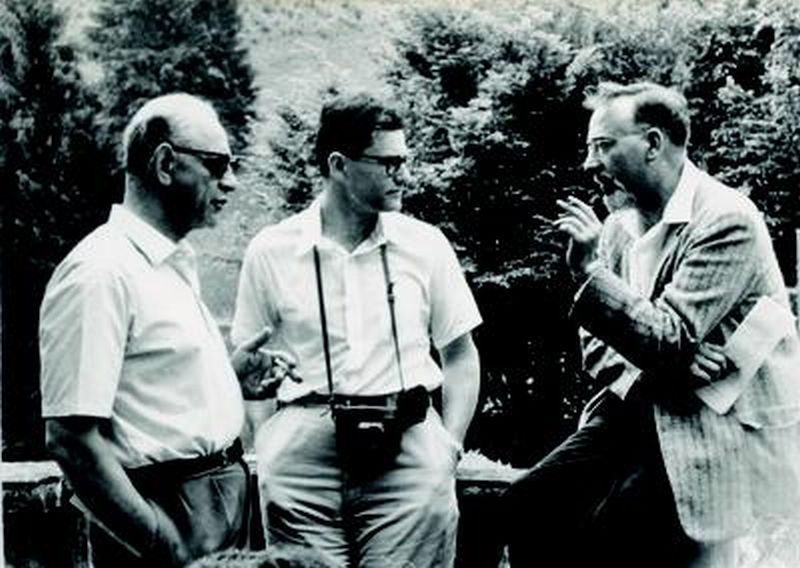
- Bruck (right) with Karl W. Gruenberg (center) and Kurt Hirsch
- Born: December 26, 1914
- Died: December 18, 1991 (aged 76)
- Education: University of Toronto
- Known for: Loops, Bruck–Ryser theorem, finite nets, Bruck–Bose construction
- Spouse: Helen
- Awards: Guggenheim Fellowship; Chauvenet Prize (1956)
- Scientific career
- Fields: Mathematics
- Workplaces: University of Wisconsin–Madison
- Thesis: The General Linear Group in a Field of Characteristic p (1940)
- Doctoral advisor: Richard Brauer
- Doctoral students: George I. Glauberman; Michael G. Aschbacher; Sue Whitesides

Richard Hubert Bruck (December 26, 1914 – December 18, 1991) was an American mathematician best known for his work in the field of algebra, especially in its relation to projective geometry and combinatorics.

== Biography ==
Bruck studied at the University of Toronto, where he received his doctorate in 1940 under the supervision of Richard Brauer. He spent most his career as a professor at University of Wisconsin–Madison, advising at least 31 doctoral students.

He is best known for his 1949 paper coauthored with H. J. Ryser, the results of which became known as the Bruck–Ryser theorem (now known in a generalized form as the Bruck-Ryser-Chowla theorem), concerning the possible orders of finite projective planes.

In 1946, he was awarded a Guggenheim Fellowship. In 1956, he was awarded the Chauvenet Prize for his article Recent Advances in the Foundations of Euclidean Plane Geometry. In 1962, he was an invited speaker at the International Congress of Mathematicians in Stockholm. In 1963, he was a Fulbright Lecturer at the University of Canberra. In 1965 a Groups and Geometry conference was held at the University of Wisconsin in honor of Bruck's retirement.

Dick Bruck and his wife Helen were supporters of the fine arts. They were patrons of the regional American Players Theatre in Wisconsin.

== Selected publications ==
- Bruck, R.H. (1946), "Contributions to the theory of loops", Transactions of the American Mathematical Society, 60 (2): 245–354, doi:10.2307/1990147, JSTOR 1990147
- Bruck, R. H.; Ryser, H. J. (1949). "The nonexistence of certain finite projective planes". Canadian Journal of Mathematics. 1: 88–92. doi:10.4153/CJM-1949-009-2. S2CID 123440808.
- Bruck, R.H.; Kleinfeld, Erwin (1951), "The structure of alternative division rings", Proceedings of the American Mathematical Society, 2 (6): 878–890, doi:10.1090/s0002-9939-1951-0045099-9, PMC 1063309, PMID 16578361
- Bruck, R.H. (1951), "Finite Nets.I.Numerical invariants", Canadian Journal of Mathematics, 3 (1): 94–106, doi:10.4153/cjm-1951-012-7, hdl:10338.dmlcz/101384, S2CID 124575806
- Bruck, R.H. (1963), "Finite Nets.II.Uniqueness and imbedding", Pacific Journal of Mathematics, 13 (2): 421–457, doi:10.2140/pjm.1963.13.421
- Bruck, R. H. (1955). "Recent Advances in the Foundations of Euclidean Geometry". The American Mathematical Monthly. 62 (7). Mathematical Association of America: 2–17. doi:10.2307/2308175. JSTOR 2308175.
- Bruck, R.H. (1955), "Difference sets in a finite group", Transactions of the American Mathematical Society, 78 (2): 464–481, doi:10.1090/s0002-9947-1955-0069791-3
- Bruck, R. H. (1958), A Survey of Binary Systems, Berlin: Springer-Verlag (3rd ed. in 1971, ISBN 978-0-387-03497-3)
- Bruck, R. H. (1960), "Some theorems on Moufang loops", Math. Z., 73 (1): 59–78, doi:10.1007/bf01163269, S2CID 121239766
- Bruck, R.H.; Bose, R.C. (1964), "The construction of translation planes from projective spaces", Journal of Algebra, 1: 85–102, doi:10.1016/0021-8693(64)90010-9
