= Clement W. H. Lam =

Canadian mathematician

Clement Wing Hong Lam (Chinese: 林永康) is a Canadian mathematician, specializing in combinatorics. He is famous for the computer proof, with Larry Thiel and S. Swiercz, of the nonexistence of a finite projective plane of order 10.

Lam earned his PhD in 1974 under Herbert Ryser at Caltech with thesis Rational G-Circulants Satisfying the Matrix Equation $A^2=d I+\lambda J$. He is a professor at Concordia University in Montreal.

In 2006 he received the Euler medal. In 1992 he received the Lester Randolph Ford Award for the article The search for a finite projective plane of order 10. The eponymous Lam's problem is equivalent to finding a finite projective plane of order 10 or finding 9 orthogonal Latin squares of order 10.

== See also ==
- Experimental mathematics
