= Transylvania lottery =

The Fano plane with points labelled

In mathematical combinatorics, the Transylvania lottery is a lottery where players select three numbers from 1 to 14 for each ticket, and then three numbers are chosen randomly. A ticket wins if two of the numbers match the random ones. The problem asks how many tickets the player must buy in order to be certain of winning. (Javier Martínez, Gloria Gutiérrez & Pablo Cordero et al. 2008, p.85)(Mazur 2010, p.280 problem 15)

An upper bound can be given using the Fano plane with a collection of 14 tickets in two sets of seven. Each set of seven uses every line of a Fano plane, labelled with the numbers 1 to 7, and 8 to 14.

Low set	1-2-5	1-3-6	1-4-7	2-3-7	2-4-6	3-4-5	5-6-7
High set	8-9-12	8-10-13	8-11-14	9-10-14	9-11-13	10-11-12	12-13-14

At least two of the three randomly chosen numbers must be in one Fano plane set, and any two points on a Fano plane are on a line, so there will be a ticket in the collection containing those two numbers. There is a 6/13×5/12=5/26 chance that all three randomly chosen numbers are in the same Fano plane set. In this case, there is a 1/5 chance that they are on a line, and hence all three numbers are on one ticket, otherwise each of the three pairs are on three different tickets.

== See also ==
- Combinatorial design
- Lottery Wheeling
