= Vida Dujmović =

Canadian computer scientist and mathematician

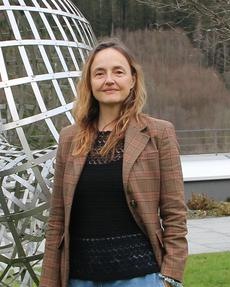
Dujmović at Oberwolfach in 2025

Vida Dujmović is a Canadian computer scientist and mathematician known for her research in graph theory and graph algorithms, and particularly for graph drawing, for the structural theory of graph width parameters including treewidth and queue number, and for the use of these parameters in the parameterized complexity of graph drawing. She is a professor of electrical engineering & computer science at the University of Ottawa, where she holds the University Research Chair in Structural and Algorithmic Graph Theory.

== Education ==
Dujmović studied telecommunications and computer science as an undergraduate at the University of Zagreb, graduating in 1996. She came to McGill University for graduate study in computer science, earning a master's degree in 2000 and completing her Ph.D. in 2004. Her dissertation, Track Layouts of Graphs, was supervised by Sue Whitesides, and won the 2005 NSERC Doctoral Prize of the Natural Sciences and Engineering Research Council.

== Career ==
She was an NSERC Postdoctoral Fellow at Carleton University, a CRM-ISM Postdoctoral Fellow at McGill University, and a postdoctoral researcher again at Carleton University before finally becoming an assistant professor at Carleton University in 2012. She moved to the University of Ottawa in 2013.

== Recognition ==
In 2023 the University of Ottawa gave her the Glinski Award for Excellence in Research and the University Research Chair in Structural and Algorithmic Graph Theory. Vida Dujmović was an invited speaker at the 9th European Congress of Mathematics.
