= Property B =

A 2-coloring of a hypergraph, equivalent to a collection C with Property B.

In mathematics, Property B is a certain set theoretic property. Formally, given a finite set $X$, a collection $C$ of subsets of $X$ has Property B if we can partition $X$ into two disjoint subsets $Y$ and $Z$ such that every set in $C$ meets both $Y$ and $Z$.

The property gets its name from mathematician Felix Bernstein, who first introduced the property in 1908.

Property B is equivalent to 2-coloring the hypergraph described by the collection $C$. A hypergraph with property B is also called 2-colorable. Sometimes it is also called bipartite, by analogy to the bipartite graphs (see bipartite hypergraph). Property B is often studied for uniform hypergraphs (set systems in which all subsets of the system have the same cardinality) but it has also been considered in the non-uniform case.

Some formulations use combinatorial designs, where the collection is a design, the sets are blocks, and the elements are points.

The problem of checking whether a collection $C$ has Property B is called the set splitting problem.

== Smallest collections without property B ==
The Steiner triple system $S_7$, the smallest 3-uniform collection that doesn't have property B.

Unsolved problem in mathematics
What is the smallest collection of $n$-uniform sets without Property B for all $n$?
More unsolved problems in mathematics

The smallest number of sets in a collection of sets of size $n$ such that $C$ does not have Property B is denoted by $m(n)$.

=== Small values of m(n) ===
For $n = 1, 2, 3, 4$:

m(n)=1,3,7,23  (sequence A392185 in the OEIS)

$m(1)=1$:
For $n = 1$, set $X = \{1\}$, and $C = \{\{1\}\}$. Then $C$ does not have Property B.

$m(2)=3$:
For $n = 1$, set $X = \{1, 2, 3\}$ and $C = \{\{1, 2\}, \{1, 3\}, \{2, 3\}\}$ (a triangle). Then $C$ does not have Property B, so $m(2) \le 3$. However, for $C' = \{\{1, 2\}, \{1, 3\}\}$, $X$ has a partition into sets $Y = \{1\}$ and $Z = \{2, 3\}$, so $m(2) \ge 3$.

$m(3)=7$:
For $n = 3$, set $X = \{1, 2, 3, 4, 5, 6, 7\}$, and $C = \{\{1, 2, 4\}, \{2, 3, 5\}, \{3, 4, 6\}, \{4, 5, 7\}, \{5, 6, 1\}, \{6, 7, 2\}, \{7, 1, 3\}\}$ (the Steiner triple system $S_7$), $C$ does not have Property B (so $m(3) \le 7$), but if any element of $C$ is omitted, then that element can be taken as $Y$, and the set of remaining elements $C'$ will have Property B (so for this particular case, $m(3) \ge 7$). One may check all other collections of 6 3-sets to see that all have Property B.

$m(4)=23$:
Östergård (2014) through an exhaustive search found $m(4) = 23$. Before, Seymour (1974) constructed a hypergraph on 11 vertices with 23 edges without Property B, showing that $m(4) \le 23$, and Manning in 1995 had narrowed the floor such that $m(4) \ge 20$, then to $m(4) \ge 21$ in 1997.

$32 \le m(5) \le 51$:
The bounds for even the next unknown value are quite far apart. On the lower end, only collections with certain numbers of unique elements could potentially not have Property B, but this range grows larger further from the lower bound. The lower bound was improved from 28 to 29 in 2020, and then to 32 in 2024.

=== Asymptotics of m(n) ===
Erdős (1963) proved that for any collection of fewer than $2^{n-1}$ sets of size $n$, there exists a 2-coloring in which all sets are bichromatic. The proof is simple: Consider a random coloring. The probability that an arbitrary set is monochromatic is $2^{-n+1}$. By a union bound, the probability that there exist a monochromatic set is less than $2^{n-1}2^{-n+1} = 1$. Therefore, there exists a good coloring.

Erdős (1964) showed the existence of an $n$-uniform hypergraph with $O(2^n \cdot n^2)$ hyperedges which does not have property B (i.e., does not have a 2-coloring in which all hyperedges are bichromatic), establishing an upper bound.

Schmidt (1964) proved that every collection of at most $n/(n+4)\cdot 2^n$ sets of size n has property B. Erdős and Lovász conjectured that $m(n) = \theta(2^n \cdot n)$. Beck in 1978 improved the lower bound to $m(n) = \Omega(n^{1/3 - \epsilon}2^n)$, where $\epsilon$ is an arbitrary small positive number. In 2000, Radhakrishnan and Srinivasan improved the lower bound to $m(n) = \Omega(2^n \cdot \sqrt{n / \log n})$ using a probabilistic algorithm.

=== Other partial results ===
For a design without Property B, merging any pair of points not occurring in any block of the design creates another design without Property B. The search may thus be restricted to designs that cover all pairs of points, known as covering designs.

== See also ==
- Sylvester–Gallai theorem § Colored points
- Set splitting problem
