= Sue Whitesides =

Canadian mathematician and computer scientist

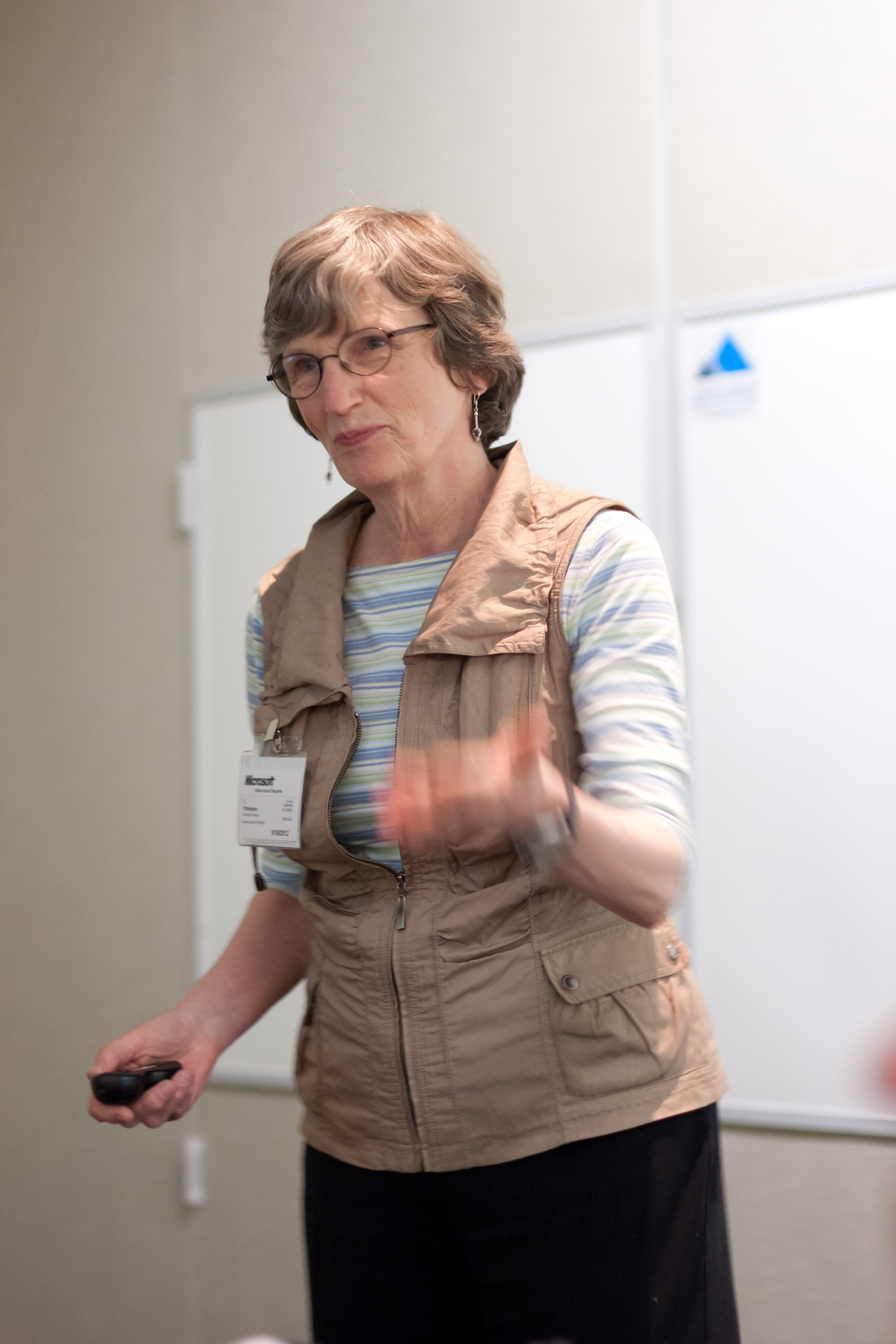
- Whitesides in 2012

Academic background
- Education: University of Wisconsin–Madison (PhD)
- Thesis: Collineations of Projective Planes of Order 10 (1975)
- Doctoral advisor: Richard Bruck

Academic work
- Discipline: Mathematics, computer science
- Sub-discipline: Computational geometry, graph drawing
- Institutions: University of Victoria McGill University Dartmouth College
- Doctoral students: Vida Dujmović

Sue Hays Whitesides is a Canadian mathematician and computer scientist, a professor emeritus of computer science and the chair of the computer science department at the University of Victoria in British Columbia, Canada. Her research specializations include computational geometry and graph drawing.

== Education and career ==
Whitesides received her Ph.D. in mathematics in 1975 from the University of Wisconsin–Madison, under the supervision of Richard Bruck. Before joining the University of Victoria faculty, she taught at Dartmouth College and McGill University; at McGill, she was director of the School of Computer Science from 2005 to 2008.

== Service ==
Whitesides was the program chair for the 1998 International Symposium on Graph Drawing and program co-chair for the 2012 Symposium on Computational Geometry.
