= Block design =

Structure in combinatorial mathematics

In combinatorial mathematics, a block design is an incidence structure consisting of a set together with a family of subsets known as blocks, chosen such that number of occurrences of each element satisfies certain conditions making the collection of blocks exhibit symmetry (balance). Block designs have applications in many areas, including experimental design, finite geometry, physical chemistry, software testing, cryptography, and algebraic geometry.

Without further specifications the term block design usually refers to a balanced incomplete block design (BIBD), specifically (and also synonymously) a 2-design, which has been the most intensely studied type historically due to its application in the design of experiments. Its generalization is known as a t-design.

== Overview ==
A design is said to be balanced (up to t) if all t-subsets of the original set occur in equally many (i.e., λ) blocks. When t is unspecified, it can usually be assumed to be 2, which means that each pair of elements is found in the same number of blocks and the design is pairwise balanced. For t = 1, each element occurs in the same number of blocks (the replication number, denoted r) and the design is said to be regular. A block design in which all the blocks have the same size (usually denoted k) is called uniform or proper. The designs discussed in this article are all uniform. Block designs that are not necessarily uniform have also been studied; for t = 2 they are known in the literature under the general name pairwise balanced designs (PBDs). Any uniform design balanced up to t is also balanced in all lower values of t (though with different λ-values), so for example a pairwise balanced (t = 2) design is also regular (t = 1). When the balancing requirement fails, a design may still be partially balanced if the t-subsets can be divided into n classes, each with its own (different) λ-value. For t = 2 these are known as PBIBD(n) designs, whose classes form an association scheme.

Designs are usually said (or assumed) to be incomplete, meaning that the collection of blocks is not all possible k-subsets, thus ruling out a trivial design.

Block designs may or may not have repeated blocks. Designs without repeated blocks are called simple, in which case the "family" of blocks is a set rather than a multiset.

In statistics, the concept of a block design may be extended to non-binary block designs, in which blocks may contain multiple copies of an element (see blocking (statistics)). There, a design in which each element occurs the same total number of times is called equireplicate, which implies a regular design only when the design is also binary. The incidence matrix of a non-binary design lists the number of times each element is repeated in each block.

== Regular uniform designs (configurations) ==
The simplest type of "balanced" design (t = 1) is known as a tactical configuration or 1-design. The corresponding incidence structure in geometry is known simply as a configuration, see Configuration (geometry). Such a design is uniform and regular: each block contains k elements and each element is contained in r blocks. The number of set elements v and the number of blocks b are related by $bk = vr$, which is the total number of element occurrences.

Every binary matrix with constant row and column sums is the incidence matrix of a regular uniform block design. Also, each configuration has a corresponding biregular bipartite graph known as its incidence or Levi graph.

== Pairwise balanced uniform designs (2-designs or BIBDs) ==
Given a finite set X (of elements called points) and integers k, r, λ ≥ 1, we define a 2-design (or BIBD, standing for balanced incomplete block design) B to be a family of k-element subsets of X, called blocks, such that any x in X is contained in r blocks, and any pair of distinct points x and y in X is contained in λ blocks. Here, the condition that any x in X is contained in r blocks is redundant, as shown below.

Here v (the number of elements of X, called points), b (the number of blocks), k, r, and λ are the parameters of the design. (To avoid degenerate examples, it is also assumed that v > k, so that no block contains all the elements of the set. This is the meaning of "incomplete" in the name of these designs.) In a table:

v	points, number of elements of X
b	number of blocks
r	number of blocks containing a given point
k	number of points in a block
λ	number of blocks containing any 2 (or more generally t) distinct points

The design is called a (v, k, λ)-design or a (v, b, r, k, λ)-design. The parameters are not all independent; v, k, and λ determine b and r, and not all combinations of v, k, and λ are possible. The two basic equations connecting these parameters are

$$bk = vr,$$

obtained by counting the number of pairs (B, p) where B is a block and p is a point in that block, and

$$\lambda(v-1) = r(k-1),$$

obtained from counting for a fixed x the triples (x, y, B) where x and y are distinct points and B is a block that contains them both. This equation for every x also proves that r is constant (independent of x) even without assuming it explicitly, thus proving that the condition that any x in X is contained in r blocks is redundant and r can be computed from the other parameters.

The resulting b and r must be integers, which imposes conditions on v, k, and λ. These conditions are not sufficient as, for example, a (43,7,1)-design does not exist.

The order of a 2-design is defined to be n = r − λ. The complement of a 2-design is obtained by replacing each block with its complement in the point set X. It is also a 2-design and has parameters v′ = v, b′ = b, r′ = b − r, k′ = v − k, λ′ = λ + b − 2r. A 2-design and its complement have the same order.

A fundamental theorem, Fisher's inequality, named after the statistician Ronald Fisher, is that b ≥ v in any 2-design.

A rather surprising and not very obvious (but very general) combinatorial result for these designs is that if points are denoted by any arbitrarily chosen set of equally or unequally spaced numerics, there is no choice of such a set which can make all block-sums (that is, sum of all points in a given block) constant. For other designs such as partially balanced incomplete block designs this may however be possible. Many such cases are discussed in. However, it can also be observed trivially for the magic squares or magic rectangles which can be viewed as the partially balanced incomplete block designs.

=== Examples ===
The unique (6,3,2)-design (v = 6, k = 3, λ = 2) has 10 blocks (b = 10) and each element is repeated 5 times (r = 5). Using the symbols 0 − 5, the blocks are the following triples:

012 013 024 035 045 125 134 145 234 235.

and the corresponding incidence matrix (a v×b binary matrix with constant row sum r and constant column sum k) is:

$$\begin{pmatrix}
1 & 1 & 1 & 1 & 1 & 0 & 0 & 0 & 0 & 0 \\
1 & 1 & 0 & 0 & 0 & 1 & 1 & 1 & 0 & 0 \\
1 & 0 & 1 & 0 & 0 & 1 & 0 & 0 & 1 & 1 \\
0 & 1 & 0 & 1 & 0 & 0 & 1 & 0 & 1 & 1 \\
0 & 0 & 1 & 0 & 1 & 0 & 1 & 1 & 1 & 0 \\
0 & 0 & 0 & 1 & 1 & 1 & 0 & 1 & 0 & 1 \\
\end{pmatrix}$$

One of four nonisomorphic (8,4,3)-designs has 14 blocks with each element repeated 7 times. Using the symbols 0 − 7 the blocks are the following 4-tuples:

0123 0124 0156 0257 0345 0367 0467 1267 1346 1357 1457 2347 2356 2456.

The unique (7,3,1)-design is symmetric and has 7 blocks with each element repeated 3 times. Using the symbols 0 − 6, the blocks are the following triples:

013 026 045 124 156 235 346.

This design is associated with the Fano plane, with the elements and blocks of the design corresponding to the points and lines of the plane. Its corresponding incidence matrix can also be symmetric, if the labels or blocks are sorted the right way:

$$\left ( \begin{matrix}
1 & 1 & 1 & 0 & 0 & 0 & 0\\
1 & 0 & 0 & 1 & 1 & 0 & 0 \\
1 & 0 & 0 & 0 & 0 & 1 & 1 \\
0 & 1 & 0 & 1 & 0 & 1 & 0 \\
0 & 1 & 0 & 0 & 1 & 0 & 1 \\
0 & 0 & 1 & 1 & 0 & 0 & 1 \\
0 & 0 & 1 & 0 & 1 & 1 & 0
\end{matrix} \right )$$

== Symmetric 2-designs (SBIBDs) ==
The case of equality in Fisher's inequality, that is, a 2-design with an equal number of points and blocks, is called a symmetric design. Symmetric designs have the smallest number of blocks among all the 2-designs with the same number of points.

In a symmetric design r = k holds as well as b = v, and, while it is generally not true in arbitrary 2-designs, in a symmetric design every two distinct blocks meet in λ points. A theorem of Ryser provides the converse. If X is a v-element set, and B is a v-element set of k-element subsets (the "blocks"), such that any two distinct blocks have exactly λ points in common, then (X, B) is a symmetric block design.

The parameters of a symmetric design satisfy

$$\lambda (v-1) = k(k-1).$$

This imposes strong restrictions on v, so the number of points is far from arbitrary. The Bruck–Ryser–Chowla theorem gives necessary, but not sufficient, conditions for the existence of a symmetric design in terms of these parameters.

The following are important examples of symmetric 2-designs:

=== Projective planes ===
Finite projective planes are symmetric 2-designs with λ = 1 and order n > 1. For these designs the symmetric design equation becomes:

$$v-1 = k(k-1).$$

Since k = r we can write the order of a projective plane as n = k − 1 and, from the displayed equation above, we obtain v = (n + 1)n + 1 = n^{2} + n + 1 points in a projective plane of order n.

As a projective plane is a symmetric design, we have b = v, meaning that b = n^{2} + n + 1 also. The number b is the number of lines of the projective plane. There can be no repeated lines since λ = 1, so a projective plane is a simple 2-design in which the number of lines and the number of points are always the same. For a projective plane, k is the number of points on each line and it is equal to n + 1. Similarly, r = n + 1 is the number of lines with which a given point is incident.

For n = 2 we get a projective plane of order 2, also called the Fano plane, with v = 4 + 2 + 1 = 7 points and 7 lines. In the Fano plane, each line has n + 1 = 3 points and each point belongs to n + 1 = 3 lines.

Projective planes are known to exist for all orders which are prime numbers or powers of primes. They form the only known infinite family (with respect to having a constant λ value) of symmetric block designs.

=== Biplanes ===
A biplane or biplane geometry is a symmetric 2-design with λ = 2; that is, every set of two points is contained in two blocks ("lines"), while any two lines intersect in two points. They are similar to finite projective planes, except that rather than two points determining one line (and two lines determining one point), two points determine two lines (respectively, points). A biplane of order n is one whose blocks have k = n + 2 points; it has v = 1 + (n + 2)(n + 1)/2 points (since r = k).

The 18 known examples are listed below.

- (Trivial) The order 0 biplane has 2 points (and lines of size 2; a 2-(2,2,2) design); it is two points, with two blocks, each consisting of both points. Geometrically, it is the digon.
- The order 1 biplane has 4 points (and lines of size 3; a 2-(4,3,2) design); it is the complete design with v = 4 and k = 3. Geometrically, the points are the vertices of a tetrahedron and the blocks are its faces.
- The order 2 biplane is the complement of the Fano plane: it has 7 points (and lines of size 4; a 2-(7,4,2)), where the lines are given as the complements of the (3-point) lines in the Fano plane.
- The order 3 biplane has 11 points (and lines of size 5; a 2-(11,5,2)), and is also known as the Paley biplane after Raymond Paley; it is associated to the Paley digraph of order 11, which is constructed using the field with 11 elements, and is the Hadamard 2-design associated to the size 12 Hadamard matrix; see Paley construction I.

Algebraically this corresponds to the exceptional embedding of the projective special linear group PSL(2,5) in PSL(2,11) – see projective linear group: action on p points for details.

- There are three biplanes of order 4 (and 16 points, lines of size 6; a 2-(16,6,2)). One is the Kummer configuration. These three designs are also Menon designs.
- There are four biplanes of order 7 (and 37 points, lines of size 9; a 2-(37,9,2)).
- There are five biplanes of order 9 (and 56 points, lines of size 11; a 2-(56,11,2)).
- Two biplanes are known of order 11 (and 79 points, lines of size 13; a 2-(79,13,2)).

Biplanes of orders 5, 6, 8 and 10 do not exist, as shown by the Bruck-Ryser-Chowla theorem.

=== Hadamard 2-designs ===
An Hadamard matrix of size m is an m × m matrix H whose entries are ±1 such that HH^{⊤} = mI_{m}, where H^{⊤} is the transpose of H and I_{m} is the m × m identity matrix. An Hadamard matrix can be put into standardized form (that is, converted to an equivalent Hadamard matrix) where the first row and first column entries are all +1. If the size m > 2 then m must be a multiple of 4.

Given an Hadamard matrix of size 4a in standardized form, remove the first row and first column and convert every −1 to a 0. The resulting 0–1 matrix M is the incidence matrix of a symmetric 2-(4a − 1, 2a − 1, a − 1) design called an Hadamard 2-design. It contains $4a-1$ blocks/points; each contains/is contained in $2a-1$ points/blocks. Each pair of points is contained in exactly $a-1$ blocks.

This construction is reversible, and the incidence matrix of a symmetric 2-design with these parameters can be used to form an Hadamard matrix of size 4a.

== Resolvable 2-designs ==
A resolvable 2-design is a BIBD whose blocks can be partitioned into sets (called parallel classes), each of which forms a partition of the point set of the BIBD. The set of parallel classes is called a resolution of the design.

If a 2-(v,k,λ) resolvable design has c parallel classes, then b ≥ v + c − 1.

Consequently, a symmetric design can not have a non-trivial (more than one parallel class) resolution.

Archetypical resolvable 2-designs are the finite affine planes. A solution of the famous 15 schoolgirl problem is a resolution of a 2-(15,3,1) design.

== General balanced designs (t-designs) ==
Given any positive integer t, a t-design B is a class of k-element subsets of X, called blocks, such that every point x in X appears in exactly r blocks, and every t-element subset T appears in exactly λ blocks. The numbers v (the number of elements of X), b (the number of blocks), k, r, λ, and t are the parameters of the design. The design may be called a t-(v,k,λ)-design. Again, these four numbers determine b and r and the four numbers themselves cannot be chosen arbitrarily. The equations are

$$\lambda_i = \lambda \left.\binom{v-i}{t-i} \right/ \binom{k-i}{t-i} \text{ for } i = 0,1,\ldots,t,$$

where λ_{i} is the number of blocks that contain any i-element set of points and λ_{t} = λ.

Note that $b=\lambda_0 = \lambda {v\choose t} / {k\choose t}$ and $r = \lambda_1 = \lambda {v-1 \choose t-1} / {k-1 \choose t-1}$.

Theorem: Any t-(v,k,λ)-design is also an s-(v,k,λ_{s})-design for any s with 1 ≤ s ≤ t. (Note that the "lambda value" changes as above and depends on s.)

A consequence of this theorem is that every t-design with t ≥ 2 is also a 2-design.

A t-(v,k,1)-design is called a Steiner system.

The term block design by itself usually means a 2-design.

=== Derived and extendable t-designs ===
Let D = (X, B) be a t-(v,k,λ) design and p a point of X. The derived design D_{p} has point set X − {p} and as block set all the blocks of D which contain p with p removed. It is a (t − 1)-(v − 1, k − 1, λ) design. Note that derived designs with respect to different points may not be isomorphic. A design E is called an extension of D if E has a point p such that E_{p} is isomorphic to D; we call D extendable if it has an extension.

Theorem: If a t-(v,k,λ) design has an extension, then k + 1 divides b(v + 1).

The only extendable projective planes (symmetric 2-(n^{2} + n + 1, n + 1, 1) designs) are those of orders 2 and 4.

Every Hadamard 2-design is extendable (to an Hadamard 3-design).

Theorem:. If D, a symmetric 2-(v,k,λ) design, is extendable, then one of the following holds:

1. D is an Hadamard 2-design,
2. v = (λ + 2)(λ^{2} + 4λ + 2), k = λ^{2} + 3λ + 1,
3. v = 495, k = 39, λ = 3.

Note that the projective plane of order two is an Hadamard 2-design; the projective plane of order four has parameters which fall in case 2; the only other known symmetric 2-designs with parameters in case 2 are the order 9 biplanes, but none of them are extendable; and there is no known symmetric 2-design with the parameters of case 3.

==== Inversive planes ====
A design with the parameters of the extension of an affine plane, i.e., a 3-(n^{2} + 1, n + 1, 1) design, is called a finite inversive plane, or Möbius plane, of order n.

It is possible to give a geometric description of some inversive planes, indeed, of all known inversive planes. An ovoid in PG(3,q) is a set of q^{2} + 1 points, no three collinear. It can be shown that every plane (which is a hyperplane since the geometric dimension is 3) of PG(3,q) meets an ovoid O in either 1 or q + 1 points. The plane sections of size q + 1 of O are the blocks of an inversive plane of order q. Any inversive plane arising this way is called egglike. All known inversive planes are egglike.

An example of an ovoid is the elliptic quadric, the set of zeros of the quadratic form

x_{1}x_{2} + f(x_{3}, x_{4}),

where f is an irreducible quadratic form in two variables over GF(q). [f(x,y) = x^{2} + xy + y^{2} for example].

If q is an odd power of 2, another type of ovoid is known – the Suzuki–Tits ovoid.

Theorem. Let q be a positive integer, at least 2. (a) If q is odd, then any ovoid is projectively equivalent to the elliptic quadric in a projective geometry PG(3,q); so q is a prime power and there is a unique egglike inversive plane of order q. (But it is unknown if non-egglike ones exist.) (b) if q is even, then q is a power of 2 and any inversive plane of order q is egglike (but there may be some unknown ovoids).

== Partially balanced designs (PBIBDs) ==
An n-class association scheme consists of a set X of size v together with a partition S of X × X into n + 1 binary relations, R_{0}, R_{1}, ..., R_{n}. A pair of elements in relation R_{i} are said to be ith–associates. Each element of X has n_{i} ith associates. Furthermore:

- $R_{0}=\{(x,x):x\in X\}$ and is called the Identity relation.
- Defining $R^* :=\{(x,y) \mid (y,x)\in R\}$, if R in S, then R* in S
- If $(x,y)\in R_k$, the number of $z\in X$ such that $(x,z)\in R_i$ and $(z,y)\in R_{j}$ is a constant $p^k_{ij}$ depending on i, j, k but not on the particular choice of x and y.

An association scheme is commutative if $p_{ij}^k=p_{ji}^k$ for all i, j and k. Most authors assume this property.

A partially balanced incomplete block design with n associate classes (PBIBD(n)) is a block design based on a v-set X with b blocks each of size k and with each element appearing in r blocks, such that there is an association scheme with n classes defined on X where, if elements x and y are ith associates, 1 ≤ i ≤ n, then they are together in precisely λ_{i} blocks.

A PBIBD(n) determines an association scheme but the converse is false.

=== Example ===
Let A(3) be the following association scheme with three associate classes on the set X = {1,2,3,4,5,6}. The (i,j) entry is s if elements i and j are in relation R_{s}.

	1	2	3	4	5	6
1	0	1	1	2	3	3
2	1	0	1	3	2	3
3	1	1	0	3	3	2
4	2	3	3	0	1	1
5	3	2	3	1	0	1
6	3	3	2	1	1	0

The blocks of a PBIBD(3) based on A(3) are:

124	134	235	456
125	136	236	456

The parameters of this PBIBD(3) are: v = 6, b = 8, k = 3, r = 4 and λ_{1} = λ_{2} = 2 and λ_{3} = 1. Also, for the association scheme we have n_{0} = n_{2} = 1 and n_{1} = n_{3} = 2. The incidence matrix M is

$$\begin{pmatrix}
1 & 1 & 1 & 1 & 0 & 0 & 0 & 0 \\
1 & 1 & 0 & 0 & 1 & 1 & 0 & 0 \\
0 & 0 & 1 & 1 & 1 & 1 & 0 & 0 \\
1 & 0 & 1 & 0 & 0 & 0 & 1 & 1 \\
0 & 1 & 0 & 0 & 1 & 0 & 1 & 1 \\
0 & 0 & 0 & 1 & 0 & 1 & 1 & 1
\end{pmatrix}$$

and the concurrence matrix MM^{T} is

$$\begin{pmatrix}
4 & 2 & 2 & 2 & 1 & 1 \\
2 & 4 & 2 & 1 & 2 & 1 \\
2 & 2 & 4 & 1 & 1 & 2 \\
2 & 1 & 1 & 4 & 2 & 2 \\
1 & 2 & 1 & 2 & 4 & 2 \\
1 & 1 & 2 & 2 & 2 & 4 \\
\end{pmatrix}$$

from which we can recover the λ and r values.

=== Properties ===
The parameters of a PBIBD(m) satisfy:

1. $vr = bk$
2. $\sum_{i=1}^m n_i = v-1$
3. $\sum_{i=1}^m n_i \lambda_i = r(k-1)$
4. $\sum_{u=0}^m p_{ju}^h = n_j$
5. $n_i p_{jh}^i = n_j p_{ih}^j$

A PBIBD(1) is a BIBD and a PBIBD(2) in which λ_{1} = λ_{2} is a BIBD.

=== Two associate class PBIBDs ===
PBIBD(2)s have been studied the most since they are the simplest and most useful of the PBIBDs. They fall into six types based on a classification of the then known PBIBD(2)s by Bose & Shimamoto (1952):

1. group divisible;
2. triangular;
3. Latin square type;
4. cyclic;
5. partial geometry type;
6. miscellaneous.

== Applications ==
The mathematical subject of block designs originated in the statistical framework of design of experiments. These designs were especially useful in applications of the technique of analysis of variance (ANOVA). This remains a significant area for the use of block designs.

While the origins of the subject are grounded in biological applications (as is some of the existing terminology), the designs are used in many applications where systematic comparisons are being made, such as in software testing.

The incidence matrix of block designs provide a natural source of interesting block codes that are used as error correcting codes. The rows of their incidence matrices are also used as the symbols in a form of pulse-position modulation.

=== Statistical application ===
Suppose that skin cancer researchers want to test three different sunscreens. They coat two different sunscreens on the upper sides of the hands of a test person. After a UV radiation they record the skin irritation in terms of sunburn. The number of treatments is 3 (sunscreens) and the block size is 2 (hands per person).

A corresponding BIBD can be generated by the R-function design.bib of the R-package agricolae and is specified in the following table:

Plots	Block	Treatment
101	1	3
102	1	2
201	2	1
202	2	3
301	3	2
302	3	1

The investigator chooses the parameters v = 3, k = 2 and λ = 1 for the block design which are then inserted into the R-function. Subsequently, the remaining parameters b and r are determined automatically.

Using the basic relations we calculate that we need b = 3 blocks, that is, 3 test people in order to obtain a balanced incomplete block design. Labeling the blocks A, B and C, to avoid confusion, we have the block design,

A = {2, 3}, B = {1, 3} and C = {1, 2}.

A corresponding incidence matrix is specified in the following table:

Treatment	Block A	Block B	Block C
1	0	1	1
2	1	0	1
3	1	1	0

Each treatment occurs in 2 blocks, so r = 2.

Just one block (C) contains the treatments 1 and 2 simultaneously and the same applies to the pairs of treatments (1,3) and (2,3). Therefore, λ = 1.

It is impossible to use a complete design (all treatments in each block) in this example because there are 3 sunscreens to test, but only 2 hands on each person.

== See also ==
- Incidence geometry
- Steiner system
- Fractional factorial design
