= Bruck–Ryser–Chowla theorem =

Nonexistence result for combinatorial block designs

The Bruck–Ryser–Chowla theorem is a result on the combinatorics of symmetric block designs that implies nonexistence of certain kinds of design. It states that if a (v, b, r, k, λ)-design exists with v = b (implying k = r and λ(v − 1) = k(k − 1)), then:

- if v is even, then k − λ is a square;
- if v is odd, then the following Diophantine equation has a nontrivial solution:
  x^{2} − (k − λ)y^{2} − (−1)^{(v−1)/2} λ z^{2} = 0.

The theorem was proved in the case of projective planes by Bruck & Ryser (1949). It was extended to symmetric designs by Chowla & Ryser (1950).

== Projective planes ==
In the special case of a symmetric design with λ = 1, that is, a projective plane, the theorem (which in this case is referred to as the Bruck–Ryser theorem) can be stated as follows: If a finite projective plane of order q exists and q is congruent to 1 or 2 (mod 4), then q must be the sum of two squares. Note that for a projective plane, the design parameters are v = b = q^{2} + q + 1, r = k = q + 1, λ = 1. Thus, v is always odd in this case.

The theorem, for example, rules out the existence of projective planes of orders 6 and 14 but allows the existence of planes of orders 10 and 12. Since a projective plane of order 10 has been shown not to exist using a combination of coding theory and large-scale computer search, the condition of the theorem is evidently not sufficient for the existence of a design. However, no stronger general non-existence criterion is known.

== Connection with incidence matrices ==
The existence of a symmetric (v, b, r, k, λ)-design is equivalent to the existence of a v × v incidence matrix R with elements 0 and 1 satisfying

R R^{T} = (k − λ)I + λJ

where I is the v × v identity matrix and J is the v × v all-1 matrix. In essence, the Bruck–Ryser–Chowla theorem is a statement of the necessary conditions for the existence of a rational v × v matrix R satisfying this equation. In fact, the conditions stated in the Bruck–Ryser–Chowla theorem are not merely necessary, but also sufficient for the existence of such a rational matrix R. They can be derived from the Hasse–Minkowski theorem on the rational equivalence of quadratic forms.
