= H. J. Ryser =

American mathematician

Herbert John Ryser
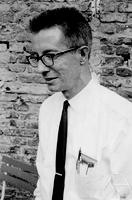
- Born: July 28, 1923; Milwaukee, Wisconsin
- Died: July 12, 1985 (aged 61); Pasadena, California
- Education: University of Toronto
- Scientific career
- Fields: Mathematics
- Workplaces: University of Wisconsin–Madison

Herbert John Ryser (July 28, 1923 – July 12, 1985) was a professor of mathematics, widely regarded as one of the major figures in combinatorics in the 20th century. He is the namesake of the Bruck–Ryser–Chowla theorem, Ryser's formula for the computation of the permanent of a matrix, and Ryser's conjecture.

== Early life ==
Ryser was born to the family of Fred G. and Edna (Huels) Ryser. He received the B.A. (1945), M.A. (1947), and Ph.D. (1948) from the University of Wisconsin. His doctoral thesis "Rational Vector Spaces" was supervised by Cornelius Joseph Everett, Jr. and Cyrus C. MacDuffee. (Ryser was Everett's only doctoral student.)

== Career ==
After his Ph.D., Ryser spent a year at Princeton's Institute for Advanced Study, then joined the faculty of Ohio State University. In 1962 he took a professorship at Syracuse University, and in 1967 moved to Caltech. His doctoral students include Richard A. Brualdi, Clement W. H. Lam, and Marion Tinsley.

Ryser contributed to the theory of combinatorial designs, finite set systems, the permanent, combinatorial functions, and to many other topics in combinatorics. He served as editor of the journals Journal of Combinatorial Theory, Linear and Multilinear Algebra, and Journal of Algebra. Ryser's estate funded an endowment creating undergraduate mathematics scholarships at Caltech known as the H. J. Ryser Scholarships.

The Journal of Combinatorial Theory, Series A denoted two issues after Ryser's passing as the "Herbert J. Ryser Memorial Issue", parts 1 and 2.

== Books ==
- Combinatorial Mathematics (1963), #14 of the Carus Mathematical Monographs, published by the Mathematical Association of America. ISBN 0-88385-014-1. Republished and translated into several languages.
- Brualdi, Richard A.; Ryser, Herbert John (1991-07-26). Combinatorial matrix theory. Cambridge University Press. p. 1. ISBN 978-0-521-32265-2.

== Selected papers ==
- Ryser, H. J. (1987). "Combinatorial Properties of Matrices of Zeros and Ones". Classic Papers in Combinatorics. pp. 269–275. doi:10.1007/978-0-8176-4842-8_18. ISBN 978-0-8176-4841-1.
- Bruck, R. H.; H. J. Ryser (1949). "The non-existence of certain finite projective planes". Canadian Journal of Mathematics. 1: 88–93. doi:10.4153/cjm-1949-009-2. S2CID 123440808.
- Ryser, H. J. (August 1951). "A combinatorial theorem with an application to Latin rectangles" (PDF). Proceedings of the American Mathematical Society. 2 (4). American Mathematical Society: 550–552. doi:10.1090/s0002-9939-1951-0042361-0.
