= Housing market =

Housing market can refer to:

- The economics of real-estate used for residential purposes; see Real estate economics.
- Real estate business - buying, selling, or renting real estate (land, buildings, or housing).
- The problem of assigning indivisible items (such as houses) to people with different preferences such that each person receives a single item; see House allocation problem.
