= Transport integrals =

In mathematics and statistical physics, the transport integrals (sometimes transport functions) are a family of special functions arising in the theory of transport phenomena of solids.

== Definition ==
The transport integrals are defined by the integral representation

$$J_n(x) = \int_0^x t^n \frac{e^t}{(e^t - 1)^2}\,dt.$$

Note that

$$\frac{e^t}{(e^t - 1)^2} = \sum_{k=0}^\infty k\,e^{kt}.$$

== See also ==
- Incomplete gamma function
