= Demand set =

A demand set is a model of the most-preferred bundle of goods an agent can afford. The set is a function of the preference relation for this agent, the prices of goods, and the agent's endowment.

Assuming the agent cannot have a negative quantity of any good, the demand set can be characterized this way:

Define $L$ as the number of goods the agent might receive an allocation of. An allocation to the agent is an element of the space $\mathbb{R}_+^L$; that is, the space of nonnegative real vectors of dimension $L$.

Define $\succeq_p$ as a weak preference relation over goods; that is, $x \succeq_p x'$ states that the allocation vector $x$ is weakly preferred to $x'$.

Let $e$ be a vector representing the quantities of the agent's endowment of each possible good, and $p$ be a vector of prices for those goods. Let $D(\succeq_p,p,e)$ denote the demand set. Then:

$D(\succeq_p,p,e) := \{x: p_x \leq p_e ~~~and~~~ p_{x'}\leq p_e \implies x'\preceq_p x \}$.

== See also ==
- Demand
- Economics
