= Linear bottleneck assignment problem =

In combinatorial optimization, a field within mathematics, the linear bottleneck assignment problem (LBAP) is similar to the linear assignment problem.

In plain words the problem is stated as follows:

There are a number of agents and a number of tasks. Any agent can be assigned to perform any task, incurring some cost that may vary depending on the agent-task assignment. It is required to perform all tasks by assigning exactly one agent to each task in such a way that the maximum cost among the individual assignments is minimized.

The term "bottleneck" is explained by a common type of application of the problem, where the cost is the duration of the task performed by an agent. In this setting the "maximum cost" is "maximum duration", which is the bottleneck for the schedule of the overall job, to be minimized.

== Formal definition ==
The formal definition of the bottleneck assignment problem is

Given two sets, A and T, together with a weight function C : A × T → R. Find a bijection f : A → T such that the cost function:

$$\max_{a\in A}C(a,f(a))$$

is minimized.

Usually the weight function is viewed as a square real-valued matrix C, so that the cost function is written down as:

$$\max_{a\in A}C_{a,f(a)}$$

== Mathematical programming formulation ==
$$\min \, \max_{i,j}	  c_{ij}x_{ij}$$

subject to:

$$\sum^n_{ j = 1}	 x_{ij} = 1      (i = 1,2,\dots, n),$$
$$\sum^n_{ i = 1}	 x_{ij} = 1      (j = 1,2,\dots, n),$$
$$x_{ij}	\in 	\{0,1\}     (i, j = 1,2,\dots,n)$$

== Asymptotics ==
Let $c^*_n$ denote the optimal objective function value for the problem with n agents and n tasks. If the costs $c_{ij}$ are sampled from the uniform distribution on (0,1), then

$$E[c^*_n] = \frac{\log n + \log 2 + \gamma}{n} + O\left(\frac{(\log n)^2}{n^{7/5}}\right)$$

and

$$Var[c_n^*] = \frac{\zeta(2) - 2(\log 2)^2}{n^2} + O\left( \frac{(\log n)^2}{n^{7/3}}\right).$$
