= Surplus =

Surplus may refer to:

- Economic surplus, one of various supplementary values
- Excess supply, a situation in which the quantity of a good or service supplied is more than the quantity demanded, and the price is above the equilibrium level determined by supply and demand
- Surplus: Terrorized into Being Consumers, a documentary film
- Surplus value, surplus labour, surplus product in Marxian economics
- "The Surplus", a 2008 episode of The Office
- Surplus (graph theory)

== See also ==
- Thomas J. Surpless (1877–1911), New York politician
- Deficit (disambiguation)
