= Marriage theorem =

In mathematics, the marriage theorem may refer to:

- Hall's marriage theorem giving necessary and sufficient conditions for the existence of a system of distinct representatives for a set system, or for a perfect matching in a bipartite graph
- The stable marriage theorem, stating that every stable marriage problem has a solution
