= Width (disambiguation) =

Width is a measure of distance from side to side, measuring across an object at right angles to the length.

Width may also refer to:

== Graph theory ==
- Width (partial order), the cardinality of a maximum antichain
- Treewidth
- Pathwidth
- Branchwidth
- Clique-width
- An alternative name for the Degeneracy (graph theory)
- Graph bandwidth
- Width of a hypergraph

== Programming ==
- %$WIDTH%, a computer environment variable in DOS Plus

== People ==
- Per Ove Width (born 1939), Norwegian politician

== See also ==
- "The Width of a Circle", a song written by David Bowie in 1969
- Wide (disambiguation)
