= 2-factor theorem =

Theorem in graph theory

In the mathematical discipline of graph theory, the 2-factor theorem, discovered by Julius Petersen, is one of the earliest works in graph theory. It can be stated as follows:

Let $G$ be a regular graph whose degree is an even number, $2k$. Then the edges of $G$ can be partitioned into $k$ edge-disjoint 2-factors.

Here, a 2-factor is a subgraph of $G$ in which all vertices have degree two; that is, it is a collection of cycles that together touch each vertex exactly once.

== Proof ==
In order to prove this generalized form of the theorem, Petersen first proved that a 4-regular graph can be factorized into two 2-factors by taking alternate edges in a Eulerian trail. He noted that the same technique used for the 4-regular graph yields a factorization of a $2k$-regular graph into two $k$-factors.

To prove this theorem, it is sufficient to consider connected graphs. A connected graph with even degree has an Eulerian trail. Traversing this Eulerian trail generates an orientation $D$ of $G$ such that every point has indegree and outdegree $= k$. Next, replace every vertex $v \in V(D)$ by two vertices $v'$ and $v''$, and replace every directed edge $uv$ of the oriented graph by an undirected edge from $u'$ to $v''$. Since $D$ has in- and outdegrees equal to $k$ the resulting bipartite graph $G'$ is $k$-regular. The edges of $G'$ can be partitioned into $k$ perfect matchings by a theorem of Kőnig. Now merging $v'$ with $v''$ for every $v$ recovers the graph $G$, and maps the $k$ perfect matchings of $G'$ onto $k$ 2-factors of $G$ which partition its edges.

== History ==
The theorem was discovered by Julius Petersen, a Danish mathematician. It is one of the first results ever discovered in the field of graph theory. The theorem appears first in the 1891 article "Die Theorie der regulären graphs". To prove the theorem, Petersen's fundamental idea was to 'colour' the edges of a trail or a path alternatively red and blue, and then to use the edges of one or both colours for the construction of other paths or trials.

== See also ==
- Petersen's theorem – every 3-regular bridgeless graph contains a 2-factor
