= Penny Haxell =

Canadian mathematician

- Education: University of Waterloo; University of Cambridge
- Scientific career
- Institutions: University of Waterloo
- Thesis: Extremal and Ramsey Type Results for Graphs and Hypergraphs (1993)
- Doctoral advisor: Béla Bollobás
- Website: https://uwaterloo.ca/combinatorics-and-optimization/profiles/penny-haxell

Penelope Evelyn Haxell is a Canadian mathematician who works as a professor in the department of combinatorics and optimization at the University of Waterloo. Her research interests include extremal combinatorics and graph theory.

== Education and career ==
Haxell earned a bachelor's degree in 1988 from the University of Waterloo, and completed a doctorate in 1993 from the University of Cambridge under the supervision of Béla Bollobás. Since then, she has worked at the University of Waterloo, where she was promoted to full professor in 2004.

== Research ==
Haxell's research accomplishments include results on the Szemerédi regularity lemma, hypergraph generalizations of Hall's marriage theorem (see Haxell's matching theorem), fractional graph packing problems, and strong coloring of graphs.

== Recognition ==
Haxell was the 2006 winner of the Krieger–Nelson Prize of the Canadian Mathematical Society.
