= Wide =

WIDE or Wide may refer to:

- Wide (cricket), a type of illegal delivery to a batter
- Wide and narrow data, terms used to describe two different presentations for tabular data
- WIDE Project, Widely Integrated Distributed Environment
- Wide-angle Infinity Display Equipment
- WIDE-LP, a radio station (99.1 FM) licensed to Madison, Wisconsin
- Women in Development Europe; see Gender mainstreaming § European Union
- wide (tennis), meaning beyond the sidelines

== People with the name Wide ==
- Ernst Wide (1888–1950), a Swedish Olympic long-distance runner
- Edvin Wide (1896–1996), a Swedish Olympic long-distance runner
- Samuel Wide (1861–1918), a Swedish archaeologist

== See also ==
- Widen
- Width (disambiguation)
