= Julius Petersen =

Danish mathematician (1839–1910)

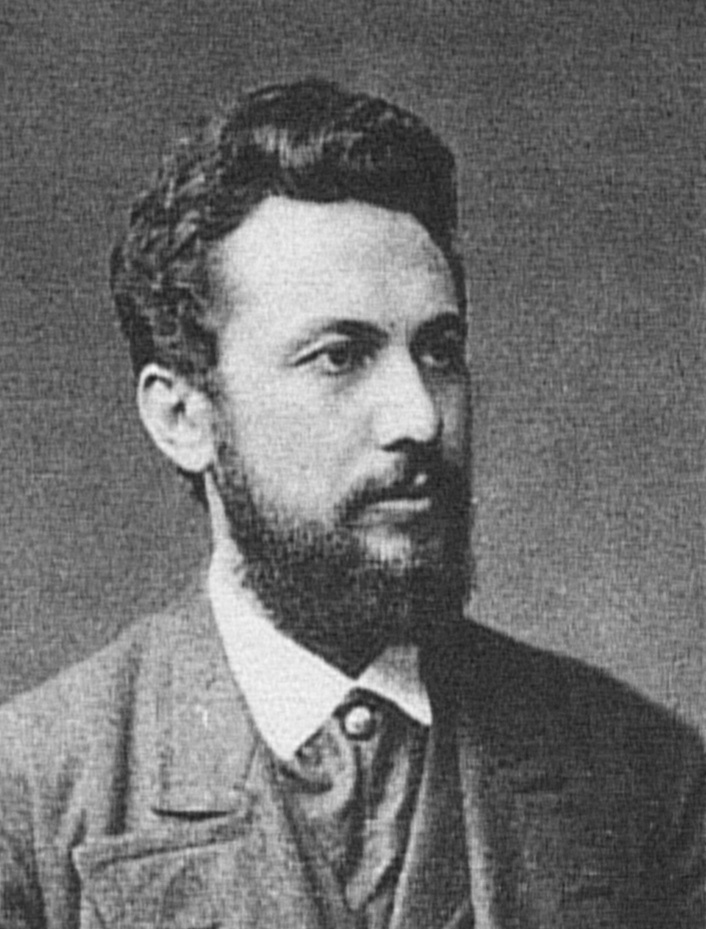
Julius Petersen.

Julius Peter Christian Petersen (16 June 1839 in Sorø, West Zealand – 5 August 1910 in Copenhagen) was a Danish mathematician. His contributions to the field of mathematics led to the birth of graph theory.

== Biography ==
Petersen's interests in mathematics were manifold, including: geometry, complex analysis, number theory, mathematical physics, mathematical economics, cryptography and graph theory. His famous paper Die Theorie der regulären graphs was a fundamental contribution to modern graph theory as we know it today. In 1898, he presented a counterexample to Tait's claimed theorem about 1-factorability of 3-regular graphs, which is nowadays known as the "Petersen graph". In cryptography and mathematical economics he made contributions which today are seen as pioneering.

He published a systematic treatment of geometrical constructions (with straightedge and compass) in 1880. A French translation was reprinted in 1990.

A special issue of Discrete Mathematics has been dedicated to the 150th birthday of Petersen.

Petersen, as he claimed, had a very independent way of thinking. In order to preserve this independence he made a habit to read as little as possible of other people's mathematics, pushing it to extremes. The consequences for his lack of knowledge of the literature of the time were severe. He spent a significant part of his time rediscovering already known results, in other cases already existing results had to be removed from a submitted paper and in other more serious cases a paper did not get published at all.

In 1891, his work received royal recognition through the award of the Order of the Dannebrog. And his death was front-page news the socialist newspaper Social-Demokraten.

== Early life and education ==
Peter Christian Julius Petersen was born on the 16th of June 1839 in Sorø on Zealand. His parents were Jens Petersen (1803–1873), a dyer by profession, and Anna Cathrine Petersen (1813–1896), born Wiuff. He had two younger brothers, Hans Christian Rudolf Petersen (1844–1868) and Carl Sophus Valdemar Petersen (1846–1935), and two sisters, Nielsine Cathrine Marie Petersen (1837–?) and Sophie Caroline Petersen (1842–?). After preparation in a private school, he was admitted in 1849 into second grade at the Sorø Academy, a prestigious boarding school. He was taken out of school after his confirmation in 1854, because his parents could not afford to keep him there, and he worked as an apprentice for almost a year in an uncle's grocery in Kolding, Jutland. The uncle died, however, and left Petersen a sum of money that enabled him to return to Sorø, pass the real-examination in 1856 with distinction, and begin his studies at the Polytechnical College in Copenhagen. In 1860 Petersen passed the first part of the civil engineering examination. By that same year he had decided to study mathematics at the university, rather than to continue with the more practical second part of the engineering education. However, his inheritance was used up and he now had to teach to make a living. From 1859 to 1871 he taught at one of Copenhagen's most prestigious private high-schools, the von Westenske Institut, with occasional part-time teaching jobs at other private schools. In 1862 he passed the student-examination, and could now enter the university. In 1866 Julius Petersen obtained the degree of magister in mathematics at the University, and by 1871 he obtained the Dr. Phil. Degree at Copenhagen University. In his doctorvita written for the university, Petersen wrote: "Mathematics had, from the time I started to learn it, taken my complete interest, and most of my work consisted in solving problems of my own and my friends, and in seeking the trisection of the angle, a problem that has had a great influence on my whole development".

In the summer of 1871, he married Laura Kirstine Bertelsen (1837–1901) and seven months later the couple had their first son Aage Wiuff-Petersen (1863–1927). Later the family increased with another son, Thor Ejnar Petersen (1867–1946), and a daughter, Agnete Helga Kathrine Petersen (1872–1941).

== Work ==
Many of Petersen's early contributions to mathematics were mainly focused on geometry. During the 1860s he wrote five textbooks along with some papers, all on geometry. One of his most remarkable works was a book, ‘Methods and Theories’. The first edition of this book appeared only in Danish, but the 1879 edition was translated into eight different languages including English, French, and Spanish, earning him an international reputation more than any of his other works.

In graph theory, two of Petersen's most famous contributions are: the Petersen graph, exhibited in 1898, served as a counterexample to Tait's ‘theorem’ on the 4-colour problem: a bridgeless 3-regular graph is factorable into three 1-factors and the theorem: ‘a connected 3-regular graph with at most two leaves contains a 1-factor’.

In 1891 Petersen published a paper in the Acta Mathematica (volume 15, pages 193–220) entitled ‘Die Theorie der regularen graphs’. It was the first paper containing (correct) results explicitly in graph theory. The paper consisted of four major parts:

(i) The transformation of the original algebraic problem into a graph theoretical one
(ii) The problem of factorizing regular graphs of even degree. Here Petersen proves his first major result, viz. that any such graph has a 2-factorization (2-factor theorem).
(iii) Criteria for the existence of edge-separating factorizations of 4-regular graphs.
(iv) The factorization of regular graphs of odd degree, in particular, the theorem that any bridgeless 3-regular graph can be decomposed into a l-factor and a 2-factor (Petersen's theorem).

Between 1887 and 1895 Petersen also contributed to mathematics with different models and instruments. one of these models was a ‘eine Serie von kinematischen Modellen’ which in 1888 was asked by ‘Verlagsbuchhandler L. Brill’ for permission to produce and sell. In 1887 Petersen had constructed another model; a planimeter which was presented to the Royal Danish Academy of Science and Letters. It consisted of an arm, of, whose one end o is fixed to the paper by a lead cylinder with a pin p, and whose other end f is connected to a second arm dc (or df) of length L. When the stylus d is moved around the domain once, the area is measured as L∫dh, where dh is the differential displacement of the arm dc orthogonal to itself.

== Last years ==
In the spring of 1908 Petersen suffered a stroke. Even in this condition his optimism and desire to work did not stop. In a letter to Mittag-Leffler in Stockholm he wrote: “I feel in all respects rather well, it is only that I cannot walk and have difficulties in talking. However, I hope to get so far this summer that I can resume my lectures in the autumn”. His last two years became a period of physical and mental debility, where, towards the end, he hardly had any memory left of his wide interests and the rich work which had filled his life. In 1909 he retired from his professorship. He died on 5 August 1910, having spent for five months in hospital. He was buried at Vestre Kirkegaard, where Copenhagen University cared for his grave until 1947.

== See also ==
- Petersen's theorem
