= Arithmetic for Parents =

Book by Ron Aharoni

- Book cover
- Author: Ron Aharoni

Arithmetic for Parents (Sumizdat, 2007, ISBN 9780977985258) is a book about mathematics education aimed at parents and teachers.

The author, Ron Aharoni, is a professor of mathematics at the Technion; he wrote the book based on his experiences teaching elementary mathematics to Israeli schoolchildren. The book was originally written in Hebrew and was translated to English, Portuguese and Dutch.
