= Perfect matching in high-degree hypergraphs =

Area of research in mathematics (graph theory)

In graph theory, perfect matching in high-degree hypergraphs is a research avenue trying to find sufficient conditions for existence of a perfect matching in a hypergraph, based only on the degree of vertices or subsets of them.

== Introduction ==
=== Degrees and matchings in graphs ===
In a simple graph G = (V, E), the degree of a vertex v, often denoted by deg(v) or δ(v), is the number of edges in E adjacent to v. The minimum degree of a graph, often denoted by deg(G) or δ(v), is the minimum of deg(v) over all vertices v in V.

A matching in a graph is a set of edges such that each vertex is adjacent to at most one edge; a perfect matching is a matching in which each vertex is adjacent to exactly one edge. A perfect matching does not always exist, and thus it is interesting to find sufficient conditions that guarantee its existence.

One such condition follows from Dirac's theorem on Hamiltonian cycles. It says that, if deg(G) ≥ n/2, then the graph admits a Hamiltonian cycle; this implies that it admits a perfect matching. The factor n/2 is tight, since the complete bipartite graph on (n/2 – 1, n/2 + 1) vertices has degree n/2 – 1 but does not admit a perfect matching.

The results described below aim to extend these results from graphs to hypergraphs.

=== Degrees in hypergraphs ===
In a hypergraph H = (V, E), each edge of E may contain more than two vertices of V. The degree of a vertex v in V is, as before, the number of edges in E that contain v. But in a hypergraph we can also consider the degree of subsets of vertices: given a subset U of V, deg(U) is the number of edges in E that contain all vertices of U. Thus, the degree of a hypergraph can be defined in different ways depending on the size of subsets whose degree is considered.

Formally, for every integer d ≥ 1, deg_{d}(H) is the minimum of deg(U) over all subsets U of V that contain exactly d vertices. Thus, deg_{1}(H) corresponds to the definition of a degree of a simple graph, namely the smallest degree of a single vertex; deg_{2}(H) is the smallest degree of a pair of vertices; etc.

A hypergraph H = (V, E) is called r-uniform if every hyperedge in E contains exactly r vertices of V. In r-uniform graphs, the relevant values of d are 1, 2, … , r – 1. In a simple graph, r = 2.

== Conditions on 1-vertex degree ==
Several authors proved sufficient conditions for the case d = 1, i.e., conditions on the smallest degree of a single vertex.

- If H is a 3-uniform hypergraph on n vertices, n is a multiple of 3, and
  $\deg_1(H)\geq\bigg(5/9+o(1)\bigg){n\choose 2},$
  then H contains a perfect matching.
- If H is a 3-uniform hypergraph on n vertices, n is a multiple of 3, and
  $\deg_1(H)\geq {n-1\choose 2} - {2n/3\choose 2}+1,$
  then H contains a perfect matching - a matching of size k. This result is the best possible.
- If H is a 4-uniform hypergraph with on n vertices, n is a multiple of 4, and
  $\deg_1(H)\geq {n-1\choose 3} - {3n/4\choose 3},$
  then H contains a perfect matching - a matching of size k. This result is the best possible.
- If H is r-uniform, n is a multiple of r, and
  $\deg_1(H)> \frac{r-1}{r}\left({\binom{n-1}{r-1}-\binom{n-kr-1}{r-1}} \right),$
  then H contains a matching of size at least k + 1. In particular, setting k = n/r – 1 gives that, if
  $\deg_1(H)> \frac{r-1}{r}\left({\binom{n-1}{r-1}-1} \right),$
  then H contains a perfect matching.
- If H is r-uniform and r-partite, each side contains exactly n vertices, and
  $\deg_1(H)> \frac{r-1}{r}\left({n^{r-1}-(n-k)^{r-1}} \right),$
  then H contains a matching of size at least k + 1. In particular, setting k = n – 1 gives that if
  $\deg_1(H)> \frac{r-1}{r}\left({n^{r-1}-1} \right),$
  then H contains a perfect matching.

For comparison, Dirac's theorem on Hamiltonian cycles says that, if H is 2-uniform (i.e., a simple graph) and

$$\deg_1(H) \geq {n-1\choose 1} - {n/2\choose 1} + 1  = n/2,$$

then H admits a perfect matching.

== Conditions on (r-1)-tuple degree ==
Several authors proved sufficient conditions for the case d = r – 1, i.e., conditions on the smallest degree of sets of r – 1 vertices, in r-uniform hypergraphs with n vertices.

=== In r-partite r-uniform hypergraphs ===
The following results relate to r-partite hypergraphs that have exactly n vertices on each side (rn vertices overall):

- If $\deg_{r-1}(H)\geq n/2 + \sqrt{2 n\log_2 n}$
  and n ≥ 1000, then H has a perfect matching. This expression is smallest possible up to the lower-order term; in particular, n/2 is not sufficient.
- If $\deg_{r-1}(H)\geq n/r$
  then H admits a matching that covers all but at most r – 2 vertices in each vertex class of H. The n/r factor is essentially the best possible.
- Let V_{1}, … , V_{r} be the r sides of H. If the degree of every (r – 1)-tuple in V/V_{1} is strictly larger than n/2, and the degree of every (r – 1)-tuple in V/V_{r} is at least n/2, then H admits a perfect matching.

=== In general r-uniform hypergraphs ===
- For every γ > 0, when n is large enough, if
  $\deg_{r-1}(H) \geq (1/2+\gamma)n$
  then H is Hamiltonian, and thus contains a perfect matching.
- If $\deg_{r-1}(H)\geq n/2 + 3 r^2 \sqrt{n\log_2 n}$
  and n is sufficiently large, then H admits a perfect matching.
- If $\deg_{r-1}(H)\geq n/r + 3 r^2 \sqrt{n\log_2 n},$
  then H admits a matching that covers all but at most 2r^{2} vertices.
- When n is divisible by r and sufficiently large, the threshold is
  $\deg_{r-1}(H)\geq n/2 - r + c_{k,n}$
  where c_{k,n} is a constant depending on the parity of n and k (all expressions below are the best possible):
  - 3 when r/2 is even and n/r is odd;
  - 5/2 when r is odd and ((n-1))/2 is odd;
  - 3/2 when r is odd and ((n-1))/2 is even;
  - 2 otherwise.
- When n is not divisible by r, the sufficient degree is close to n/r: if deg_{r-1}(H) ≥ n/r + O(log(n)), then H admits a perfect matching. The expression is almost the smallest possible: the smallest possible is ⌊n/r⌋.

== Other conditions ==
There are some sufficient conditions for other values of d:

- For all d ≥ r/2, the threshold for deg_{d}(H) is close to:
  $\left(\frac{1}{2}+o(1)\right)\binom{n}{r-d}.$
- For all d < r/2, the threshold for deg_{d}(H) is at most:
  $\left(\frac{r-d}{r}+o(1)\right)\binom{n-d}{r-d}$
- If H is r-partite and each side contains exactly n vertices, and
  $\deg_d(H) \geq \frac{r-d}{r}n^{r-d} + r n^{r-d-1},$
  then H contains a matching covering all but (d – 1)r vertices.
- If n is sufficiently large and divisible by r, and
  $\deg_d(H) \geq \frac{r-d}{r}\binom{n}{r-d} + r^{r+1}(\ln{n})^{1/2}n^{r-d-1/2},$
  then H contains a matching covering all but (d – 1)r vertices.

== See also ==
- Hall-type theorems for hypergraphs - lists other sufficient conditions for the existence of perfect matchings in hypergraphs, analogous to Hall's marriage theorem.
