= Ron Aharoni =

Israeli mathematician

- רון אהרוני
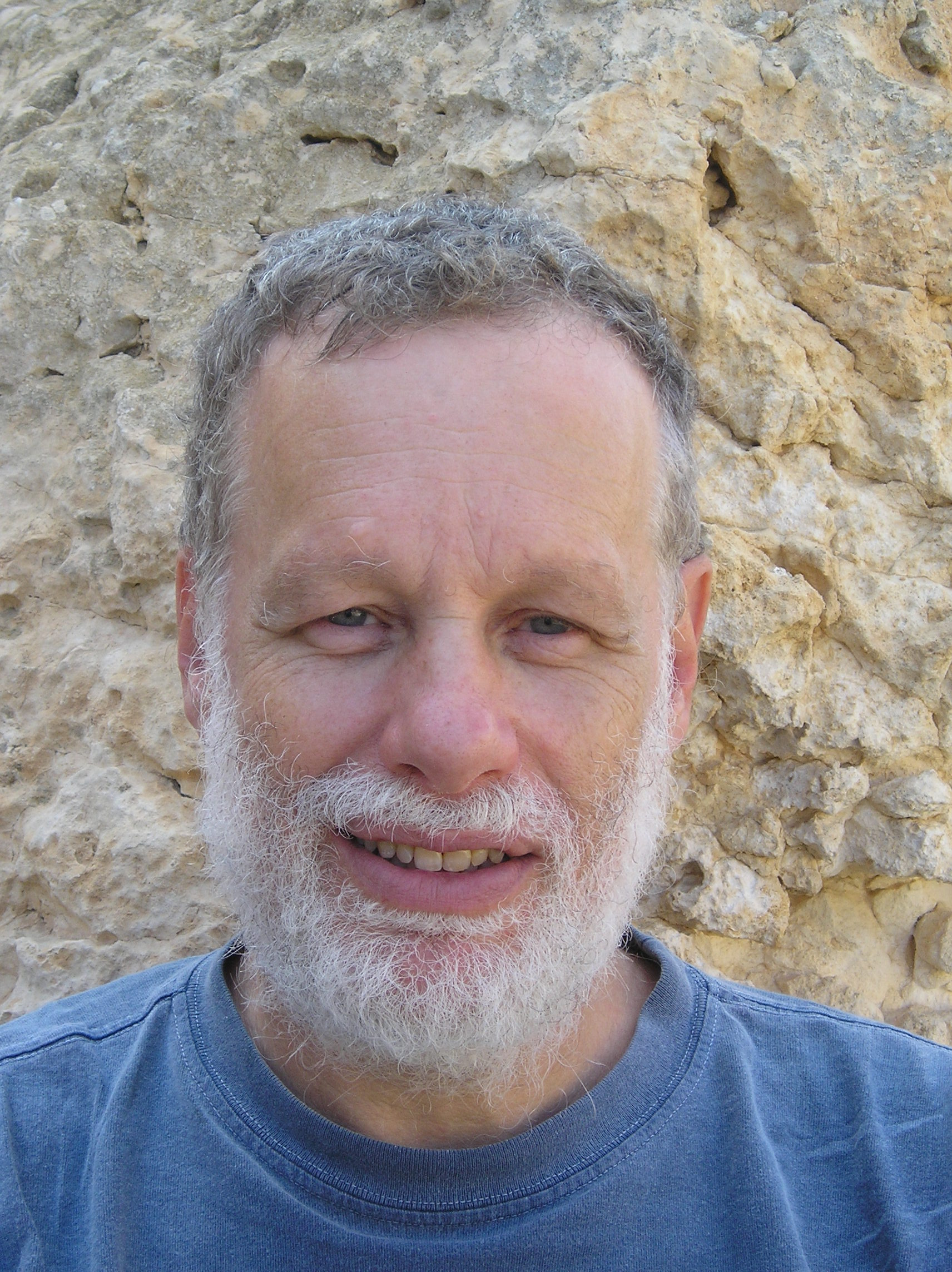
- Ron Aharoni, 2009
- Born: 1952 (age 73–74)
- Education: Technion, Brandeis University, University of Reading
- Scientific career
- Fields: Mathematics

Ron Aharoni (Hebrew: רון אהרוני; born 1952) is an Israeli mathematician, working in finite and infinite combinatorics. Aharoni is a professor at the Technion – Israel Institute of Technology, where he received his Ph.D. in mathematics in 1979. With Nash-Williams and Shelah he generalized Hall's marriage theorem by obtaining the right transfinite conditions for infinite bipartite graphs. He subsequently proved the appropriate versions of the Kőnig theorem and the Menger theorem for infinite graphs (the latter with Eli Berger). In 2000 he proved, building on joint work with P. Haxell, a topological version of Hall's theorem. This was used to prove the first open case (that of 3-uniform hypergraphs) of a famous conjecture by Ryser: in a 3-partite hypergraph the ratio between the covering number and the matching number is at most 2.

Aharoni is the author of several nonspecialist books; the most successful is Arithmetic for Parents, a book helping parents and elementary school teachers in teaching basic mathematics. He also wrote a book on the connections between Mathematics, poetry and beauty and on philosophy, The Cat That is not There. His book, "Man detaches meaning", is on a mechanism common to jokes and poetry. His last to date book is Circularity: A Common Secret to Paradoxes, Scientific Revolutions and Humor, which binds together mathematics, philosophy and the secrets of humor.

== Books ==
1. Arithmetic for Parents, A book for grownups on children's mathematics, Schocken Press 2004

2. Mathematics, poetry and beauty (in Hebrew), Hakibutz Hameuchad 2008.

3. The cat that is not there - a non-philosophical book on philosophy, Magness Press (The Hebrew University Publishing House), 2009.

4. Man detaches meaning - poems, jokes and in between, Hakibutz Hameuchad 2011.

5. Mathematics, Poetry and Beauty (in English), World Scientific Publishing 2014.

6. Arithmetic for Parents (Revised Edition), World Scientific Publishing 2015

7. Circularity: A Common Secret to Paradoxes, Scientific Revolutions and Humor, World Scientific Publishing 2016.
