= Eulerian matroid =

Independence system partitionable into circuits

The graphic matroid of an Eulerian graph (a graph with no vertices of odd degree) is always an Eulerian matroid by Veblen's theorem. The circuits of a matroid are the minimal dependent sets (the sets which become independent sets when any element is removed), which here are $\{1, 2, 3\}$ and $\{4, 5, 6\}$ (blue and orange respectively). The matroid is Eulerian because all the elements can be partitioned into disjoint circuits.

In matroid theory, an Eulerian matroid is a matroid whose elements can be partitioned into a collection of disjoint circuits.

== Examples ==
In a uniform matroid $U{}^r_n$, the circuits are the sets of exactly $r+1$ elements. Therefore, a uniform matroid is Eulerian if and only if $r+1$ is a divisor of $n$. For instance, the $n$-point lines $U{}^2_n$ are Eulerian if and only if $n$ is divisible by three.

The Fano plane has two kinds of circuits: sets of three collinear points, and sets of four points that do not contain any line. The three-point circuits are the complements of the four-point circuits, so it is possible to partition the seven points of the plane into two circuits, one of each kind. Thus, the Fano plane is also Eulerian.

== Relation to Eulerian graphs ==
Eulerian matroids were defined by Welsh (1969) as a generalization of the Eulerian graphs, graphs in which every vertex has even degree. By Veblen's theorem the edges of every such graph may be partitioned into simple cycles, from which it follows that the graphic matroids of Eulerian graphs are examples of Eulerian matroids.

The definition of an Eulerian graph above allows graphs that are disconnected, so not every such graph has an Euler tour. Wilde (1975) observes that the graphs that have Euler tours can be characterized in an alternative way that generalizes to matroids: a graph $G$ has an Euler tour if and only if it can be formed from some other graph $H$, and a cycle $C$ in $H$, by contracting the edges of $H$ that do not belong to $C$. In the contracted graph, $C$ generally stops being a simple cycle and becomes instead an Euler tour. Analogously, Wilde considers the matroids that can be formed from a larger matroid by contracting the elements that do not belong to some particular circuit. He shows that this property is trivial for general matroids (it implies only that each element belongs to at least one circuit) but can be used to characterize the Eulerian matroids among the binary matroids, matroids representable over GF(2): a binary matroid is Eulerian if and only if it is the contraction of another binary matroid onto a circuit.

== Duality with bipartite matroids ==
For planar graphs, the properties of being Eulerian and bipartite are dual: a planar graph is Eulerian if and only if its dual graph is bipartite. As Welsh showed, this duality extends to binary matroids: a binary matroid is Eulerian if and only if its dual matroid is a bipartite matroid, a matroid in which every circuit has an even number of elements.

For matroids that are not binary, the duality between Eulerian and bipartite matroids may break down. For instance, the uniform matroid $U{}^2_6$ is Eulerian but its dual $U{}^4_6$ is not bipartite, as its circuits have size five. The self-dual uniform matroid $U{}^3_6$ is bipartite but not Eulerian.

== Alternative characterizations ==
Because of the correspondence between Eulerian and bipartite matroids among the binary matroids, the binary matroids that are Eulerian may be characterized in alternative ways. The characterization of Wilde (1975) is one example; two more are that a binary matroid is Eulerian if and only if every element belongs to an odd number of circuits, if and only if the whole matroid has an odd number of partitions into circuits. Lovász & Seress (1993) collect several additional characterizations of Eulerian binary matroids, from which they derive a polynomial time algorithm for testing whether a binary matroid is Eulerian.

== Computational complexity ==
Any algorithm that tests whether a given matroid is Eulerian, given access to the matroid via an independence oracle, must perform an exponential number of oracle queries, and therefore cannot take polynomial time. In particular, it is difficult to distinguish a uniform matroid on a set of $2n$ elements, with all cycles of size $n+1$, from a paving matroid that differs from the uniform matroid in having two complementary cycles of size $n$. The paving matroid is Eulerian but the uniform matroid is not. Any oracle algorithm, applied to the uniform matroid, must make $\tbinom{2n}{n}/2$ queries, an exponential number, to verify that the input is not instead an instance of the paving matroid.

== Eulerian extension ==
If $M$ is a binary matroid that is not Eulerian, then it has a unique Eulerian extension, a binary matroid $\bar M$ whose elements are the elements of $M$ together with one additional element $e$, such that the restriction of $\bar M$ to the elements of $M$ is isomorphic to $M$. The dual of $\bar M$ is a bipartite matroid formed from the dual of $M$ by adding $e$ to every odd circuit.
