= Corank =

Complementary of a rank

In mathematics, corank is complementary to the concept of the rank of a mathematical object, and may refer to the dimension of the left nullspace of a matrix, the dimension of the cokernel of a linear transformation of a vector space, or the number of elements of a matroid minus its rank.

== Left nullspace of a matrix ==
The corank of an $m\times n$ matrix is $m-r$ where $r$ is the rank of the matrix. It is the dimension of the left nullspace and of the cokernel of the matrix. For a square matrix $M$, the corank and nullity of $M$ are equivalent.

== Cokernel of a linear transformation ==
Generalizing matrices to linear transformations of vector spaces, the corank of a linear transformation is the dimension of the cokernel of the transformation, which is the quotient of the codomain by the image of the transformation.

== Matroid ==
For a matroid with $n$ elements and matroid rank $r$, the corank or nullity of the matroid is $n-r$. In the case of linear matroids this coincides with the matrix corank. In the case of graphic matroids the corank is also known as the circuit rank or cyclomatic number.
