= Characteristic set =

Characteristic set may refer to

- The characteristic set of an algebraic matroid
- The characteristic set of a linear matroid
- Wu's method of characteristic set
