= Bipartite matroid =

Abstraction of 2-colorable graphs

In mathematics, a bipartite matroid is a matroid all of whose circuits have even size.

== Example ==
A uniform matroid $U{}^r_n$ is bipartite if and only if $r$ is an odd number, because the circuits in such a matroid have size $r+1$.

== Relation to bipartite graphs ==
Bipartite matroids were defined by Welsh (1969) as a generalization of the bipartite graphs, graphs in which every cycle has even size. A graphic matroid is bipartite if and only if it comes from a bipartite graph.

== Duality with Eulerian matroids ==
An Eulerian graph is one in which all vertices have even degree; Eulerian graphs may be disconnected. For planar graphs, the properties of being bipartite and Eulerian are dual: a planar graph is bipartite if and only if its dual graph is Eulerian. As Welsh showed, this duality extends to binary matroids: a binary matroid is bipartite if and only if its dual matroid is an Eulerian matroid, a matroid that can be partitioned into disjoint circuits.

For matroids that are not binary, the duality between Eulerian and bipartite matroids may break down. For instance, the uniform matroid $U{}^4_6$ is non-bipartite but its dual $U{}^2_6$ is Eulerian, as it can be partitioned into two 3-cycles. The self-dual uniform matroid $U{}^3_6$ is bipartite but not Eulerian.

== Computational complexity ==
It is possible to test in polynomial time whether a given binary matroid is bipartite. However, any algorithm that tests whether a given matroid is Eulerian, given access to the matroid via an independence oracle, must perform an exponential number of oracle queries, and therefore cannot take polynomial time.
