= Whitney's planarity criterion =

Characterization of planar graphs by matroids

A planar graph and its dual. Every cycle in the blue graph is a minimal cut in the red graph, and vice versa, so the two graphs are algebraic duals and have dual graphic matroids.

In mathematics, Whitney's planarity criterion is a matroid-theoretic characterization of planar graphs, named after Hassler Whitney. It states that a graph G is planar if and only if its graphic matroid is also cographic (that is, it is the dual matroid of another graphic matroid).

In purely graph-theoretic terms, this criterion can be stated as follows: There must be another (dual) graph G′ = (V′,E′) and a bijective correspondence between the edges E′ and the edges E of the original graph G, such that a subset T of E forms a spanning tree of G if and only if the edges corresponding to the complementary subset E − T form a spanning tree of G′.

== Algebraic duals ==
An equivalent form of Whitney's criterion is that a graph G is planar if and only if it has a dual graph whose graphic matroid is dual to the graphic matroid of G. A graph whose graphic matroid is dual to the graphic matroid of G is known as an algebraic dual of G. Thus, Whitney's planarity criterion can be expressed succinctly as: a graph is planar if and only if it has an algebraic dual.

== Topological duals ==
If a graph is embedded into a topological surface such as the plane, in such a way that every face of the embedding is a topological disk, then the dual graph of the embedding is defined as the graph (or in some cases multigraph) H that has a vertex for every face of the embedding, and an edge for every adjacency between a pair of faces. According to Whitney's criterion, the following conditions are equivalent:

- The surface on which the embedding exists is topologically equivalent to the plane, sphere, or punctured plane
- H is an algebraic dual of G
- Every simple cycle in G corresponds to a minimal cut in H, and vice versa
- Every simple cycle in H corresponds to a minimal cut in G, and vice versa
- Every spanning tree in G corresponds to the complement of a spanning tree in H, and vice versa.

It is possible to define dual graphs of graphs embedded on nonplanar surfaces such as the torus, but these duals do not generally have the correspondence between cuts, cycles, and spanning trees required by Whitney's criterion.
