= Rota's conjecture =

Conjecture on forbidden minors of matroids

Rota's excluded minors conjecture is one of a number of conjectures made by the mathematician Gian-Carlo Rota. Some members of the structural combinatorics community consider it an important problem. Rota conjectured in 1971 that, for every finite field, the family of matroids that can be represented over that field has only finitely many excluded minors. A proof of the conjecture was announced, but not published, in 2014 by Geelen, Gerards, and Whittle.

== Statement of the conjecture ==
If $S$ is a set of points in a vector space defined over a field $F$, then the linearly independent subsets of $S$ form the independent sets of a matroid $M$; $S$ is said to be a representation of any matroid isomorphic to $M$. Not every matroid has a representation over every field, for instance, the Fano plane is representable only over fields of characteristic two. Other matroids are representable over no fields at all. The matroids that are representable over a particular field form a proper subclass of all matroids.

A minor of a matroid is another matroid formed by a sequence of two operations: deletion and contraction. In the case of points from a vector space, deleting a point is simply the removal of that point from $S$; contraction is a dual operation in which a point is removed and the remaining points are projected onto a hyperplane that does not contain the removed point. It follows from this that if a matroid is representable over a field, then so are all its minors. A matroid that is not representable over $F$, and is minor-minimal with that property, is called an "excluded minor"; a matroid $M$ is representable over $F$ if and only if it does not contain one of the forbidden minors.

For representability over the real numbers, there are infinitely many forbidden minors. Rota's conjecture is that, for every finite field $F$, there is only a finite number of forbidden minors.

== Partial results ==
W. T. Tutte proved that the binary matroids (matroids representable over the field of two elements) have a single forbidden minor, the uniform matroid $U{}^2_4$ (geometrically, a line with four points on it).

A matroid is representable over the ternary field GF(3) if and only if it does not have one or more of the following four matroids as minors: a five-point line $U{}^2_5$, its dual matroid $U{}^3_5$ (five points in general position in three dimensions), the Fano plane, or the dual of the Fano plane. Thus, Rota's conjecture is true in this case as well. As a consequence of this result and of the forbidden minor characterization by Tutte (1958) of the regular matroids (matroids that can be represented over all fields) it follows that a matroid is regular if and only if it is both binary and ternary.

There are seven forbidden minors for the matroids representable over GF(4). They are:

- The six-point line $U{}^2_6$.
- The dual $U{}^4_6$ to the six-point line, six points in general position in four dimensions.
- A self-dual six-point rank-three matroid with a single three-point line.
- The non-Fano matroid formed by the seven points at the vertices, edge midpoints, and centroid of an equilateral triangle in the Euclidean plane. This configuration is one of two known sets of planar points with fewer than $n/2$ two-point lines.
- The dual of the non-Fano matroid.
- The eight-point matroid of a square antiprism.
- The matroid obtained by relaxing the unique pair of disjoint circuit-hyperplanes of the square antiprism.

This result won the 2003 Fulkerson Prize for its authors Jim Geelen, A. M. H. Gerards, and A. Kapoor.

For GF(5), several forbidden minors on up to 12 elements are known, but it is not known whether the list is complete.

== Reported proof ==
Geoff Whittle announced during a 2013 visit to the UK that he, Jim Geelen, and Bert Gerards had solved Rota's conjecture. The collaboration involved intense visits where the researchers sat in a room together, all day every day, in front of a whiteboard. It would take them years to write up their research in its entirety and publish it. An outline of the proof appeared 2014 in the Notices of the American Mathematical Society. Only one paper by the same authors, related to this conjecture, has subsequently appeared.
