= Independent set =

Independent set may refer to:

- Linearly independent, of a set of vectors in a vector space.
- Independent set of elements of a matroid. See Matroid#Independent sets.
- Independent set (graph theory), a set of vertices that share no edges.
