= Weighted matroid =

Objective function for greedy algorithms

In combinatorics, a branch of mathematics, a weighted matroid is a matroid endowed with a function that assigns a weight to each element. Formally, let $M = (E, I)$ be a matroid, where E is the set of elements and I is the family of independent set. A weighted matroid has a weight function $w : E \rightarrow \mathbb{R}^+$ for assigns a strictly positive weight to each element of $E$. We extend the function to subsets of $E$ by summation; $w(A)$ is the sum of $w(x)$ over $x$ in $A$.

== Finding a maximum-weight independent set ==
A basic problem regarding weighted matroids is to find an independent set with a maximum total weight. This problem can be solved using the following simple greedy algorithm:

- Initialize the set A to an empty set. Note that, by definition of a matroid, A is an independent set.
- For each element x in E\A, check whether Au{x} is still an independent set.
  - If there are no such elements, then stop, as A cannot be extended anymore.
  - If there is at least one such element, then choose the one with maximum weight, and add it to A.

This algorithm does not need to know anything about the matroid structure; it just needs an independence oracle for the matroid - a subroutine for testing whether a set is independent.

Jack Edmonds proved that this simple algorithm indeed finds an independent set with maximum weight. Denote the set found by the algorithm by e_{1},...,e_{k}. By the matroid properties, it is clear that k=rank(M), otherwise the set could be extended. Assume by contradiction that there is another set with a higher weight. Without loss of generality, it is possible to assume that this set has rank(M) elements too; denote it by f_{1},...,f_{k}. Order these items such that w(f_{1}) ≥ ... ≥ w(f_{k}). Let j be the first index for which w(f_{j}) > w(e_{j}). Apply the augmentation property to the sets {f_{1},...,f_{j}} and {e_{1},...,e_{j-1}}; we conclude that there must be some i ≤ j such that f_{i} could be added to {e_{1},...,e_{j-1}} while keeping it independent. But w(f_{i}) ≥ w(f_{j}) > w(e_{j}), so f_{i} should have been chosen in step j instead of e_{j} - a contradiction.

== Example: spanning forest algorithms ==
As a simple example, say we wish to find the maximum spanning forest of a graph. That is, given a graph and a weight for each edge, find a forest containing every vertex and maximizing the total weight of the edges in the tree. This problem arises in some clustering applications. It can be solved by Kruskal's algorithm, which can be seen as the special case of the above greedy algorithm to a graphical matroid.

If we look at the definition of the forest matroid, we see that the maximum spanning forest is simply the independent set with largest total weight — such a set must span the graph, for otherwise we can add edges without creating cycles. But how do we find it?

=== Finding a basis ===
There is a simple algorithm for finding a basis:

- Initially let $A$ be the empty set.
- For each $x$ in $E$
  - if $A \cup \{ x\}$ is independent, then set $A$ to $A \cup \{ x\}$.

The result is clearly an independent set. It is a maximal independent set because if $B \cup \{ x\}$ is not independent for some subset $B$ of $A$, then $A \cup \{ x\}$ is not independent either (the contrapositive follows from the hereditary property). Thus if we pass up an element, we'll never have an opportunity to use it later. We will generalize this algorithm to solve a harder problem.

=== Extension to optimal ===
An independent set of largest total weight is called an optimal set. Optimal sets are always bases, because if an edge can be added, it should be; this only increases the total weight. As it turns out, there is a trivial greedy algorithm for computing an optimal set of a weighted matroid. It works as follows:

- Initially let $A$ be the empty set.
- For each $x$ in $E$, taken in (monotonically) decreasing order by weight
  - if $A \cup \{ x \}$ is independent, then set $A$ to $A \cup \{ x \}$.

This algorithm finds a basis, since it is a special case of the above algorithm. It always chooses the element of largest weight that it can while preserving independence (thus the term "greedy"). This always produces an optimal set: suppose that it produces $A=\{e_1,e_2,\ldots,e_r\}$ and that $B=\{f_1,f_2,\ldots,f_r\}$. Now for any $k$ with $1\le k\le r$, consider open sets $O_1=\{e_1,\ldots,e_{k-1}\}$ and $O_2=\{f_1,\ldots,f_k\}$. Since $O_1$ is smaller than $O_2$, there is some element of $O_2$ which can be put into $O_1$ with the result still being independent. However $e_k$ is an element of maximal weight that can be added to $O_1$ to maintain independence. Thus $e_k$ is of no smaller weight than some element of $O_2$, and hence $e_k$ is of at least a large a weight as $f_k$. As this is true for all $k$, $A$ is weightier than $B$.

=== Complexity analysis ===
The easiest way to traverse the members of $E$ in the desired order is to sort them. This requires $O(|E|\log|E|)$ time using a comparison sorting algorithm. We also need to test for each $x$ whether $A \cup \{ x \}$ is independent; assuming independence tests require $O(f(|E|))$ time, the total time for the algorithm is $O(|E|\log|E| + |E|f(|E|))$.

If we want to find a minimum spanning tree instead, we simply "invert" the weight function by subtracting it from a large constant. More specifically, let $w_{\text{min}}(x) = W - w(x)$, where $W$ exceeds the total weight over all graph edges. Many more optimization problems about all sorts of matroids and weight functions can be solved in this trivial way, although in many cases more efficient algorithms can be found that exploit more specialized properties.

=== Matroid requirement ===
Note also that if we take a set $I$ of "independent" sets which is a down-set but not a matroid, then the greedy algorithm will not always work. For then there are independent sets $I_1$ and $I_2$ with $|I_1|<|I_2|$, but such that for no $e\in I_2\setminus I_1$ is $I_1\cup e$ independent.

Pick an $\epsilon>0$ and $\tau>0$ such that $(1+2\epsilon)|I_1|+\tau|E|<|I_2|$. Weight the elements of $I_1\cup I_2$ in the range $2$ to $2+2\epsilon$, the elements of $I_1\setminus I_2$ in the range $1+\epsilon$ to $1+2\epsilon$, the elements of $I_2\setminus I_1$ in the range $1$ to $1+\epsilon$, and the rest in the range $0$ to $\tau$. The greedy algorithm will select the elements of $I_1$, and then cannot pick any elements of $I_2\setminus I_1$. Therefore, the independent set it constructs will be of weight at most $(1+2\epsilon)|I_1|+\tau|E|+|I_1\cup I_2|$, which is smaller than the weight of $I_2$.

== Characterization ==
This optimization algorithm may be used to characterize matroids: if a family F of sets, closed under taking subsets, has the property that, no matter how the sets are weighted, the greedy algorithm finds a maximum-weight set in the family, then F must be the family of independent sets of a matroid.

== Generalizations ==
The notion of matroid has been generalized to allow for other types of sets on which a greedy algorithm gives optimal solutions; see greedoid and matroid embedding for more information. Korte and Lovász would generalize these ideas to objects called greedoids, which allow even larger classes of problems to be solved by greedy algorithms.
