= Algebraic matroid =

Abstraction of algebraic independence

In mathematics, an algebraic matroid is a matroid, a combinatorial structure, that expresses an abstraction of the relation of algebraic independence.

== Definition ==
Given a field extension L/K, Zorn's lemma can be used to show that there always exists a maximal algebraically independent subset of L over K. Further, all the maximal algebraically independent subsets have the same cardinality, known as the transcendence degree of the extension.

For every finite set S of elements of L, the algebraically independent subsets of S satisfy the axioms that define the independent sets of a matroid. In this matroid, the rank of a set of elements is its transcendence degree, and the flat generated by a set T of elements is the intersection of L with the field K[T]. A matroid that can be generated in this way is called algebraic or algebraically representable. No good characterization of algebraic matroids is known, but certain matroids are known to be non-algebraic; the smallest is the Vámos matroid.

== Relation to linear matroids ==
Many finite matroids may be represented by a matrix over a field K, in which the matroid elements correspond to matrix columns, and a set of elements is independent if the corresponding set of columns is linearly independent. Every matroid with a linear representation of this type over a field F may also be represented as an algebraic matroid over F, by choosing an indeterminate for each row of the matrix, and by using the matrix coefficients within each column to assign each matroid element a linear combination of these transcendentals. For fields of characteristic zero (such as the real numbers) linear and algebraic matroids coincide, but for other fields there may exist algebraic matroids that are not linear; indeed the non-Pappus matroid is algebraic over any finite field, but not linear and not algebraic over any field of characteristic zero. However, if a matroid is algebraic over a field F of characteristic zero then it is linear over F(T) for some finite set of transcendentals T over F and over the algebraic closure of F.

== Closure properties ==
If a matroid is algebraic over a simple extension F(t) then it is algebraic over F. It follows that the class of algebraic matroids is closed under contraction, and that a matroid algebraic over F is algebraic over the prime field of F.

The class of algebraic matroids is closed under truncation and matroid union. It is not known whether the dual of an algebraic matroid is always algebraic and there is no excluded minor characterisation of the class.

== Characteristic set ==
The (algebraic) characteristic set K(M) of a matroid M is the set of possible characteristics of fields over which M is algebraically representable.

- If 0 is in K(M) then all sufficiently large primes are in K(M).
- Every prime occurs as the unique characteristic for some matroid.
- If M is algebraic over F then any contraction of M is algebraic over F and hence so is any minor of M.
