= Dominic Welsh =

British mathematician (1938–2023)

James Anthony Dominic Welsh (known professionally as D.J.A. Welsh, 29 August 1938 – 30 November 2023) was an English mathematician and professor of Oxford University's Mathematical Institute. He was an expert in matroid theory, the computational complexity of combinatorial enumeration problems, percolation theory, and cryptography.

== Biography ==
Welsh obtained his Doctor of Philosophy from Oxford University under the supervision of John Hammersley. After working as a researcher at Bell Laboratories, he joined the Mathematical Institute in 1963 and became a fellow of Merton College, Oxford in 1966. He chaired the British Combinatorial Committee from 1983 to 1987. Welsh was given a personal chair in 1992 and retired in 2005. He supervised 28 doctoral students.

== Books ==
- Matroid Theory (LMS Monographs, vol. 8, Academic Press, 1976, MR 0427112, reprinted by Dover Publications, 2010, ISBN 978-0486474397)
- Probability: An Introduction (with Geoffrey Grimmett, Oxford University Press, 1986, ISBN 0-19-853264-4, MR 0869591)
- Codes and Cryptography (Oxford University Press, 1988, ISBN 978-0198532873, MR 0959137)
- Complexity: Knots, Colourings and Counting (LMS Lecture Notes, vol. 186, Oxford University Press, 1993, ISBN 0-521-45740-8, MR 1245272)
- Complexity and Cryptography: An Introduction (with John Talbot, Cambridge University Press, 2006, MR 2221458)

== Awards and honours ==
Welsh received an honorary doctorate from the University of Waterloo in 2006.

In 2007, Oxford University press published Combinatorics, Complexity, and Chance: A Tribute to Dominic Welsh, an edited volume of research papers dedicated to Welsh.

The Russo–Seymour–Welsh estimate in percolation theory is partly named after Welsh.
