= Takeo Nakasawa =

Japanese mathematician

- Born: February 5, 1913; Kōchi prefecture, Japan
- Died: June 20, 1946 (aged 33); Khabarovsk, Soviet Union
- Occupation: Mathematician
- Known for: Inventor of the theory of matroids

Takeo Nakasawa (Japanese: 中澤武雄, February 5, 1913, Kōchi prefecture, Japan – June 20, 1946, Khabarovsk, Soviet Union) was a Japanese mathematician who independently invented the theory of matroids, though his work was forgotten for many years. He published four papers (in German) of which the first three introduce the subject of matroid theory during 1935–1938, when he worked as an assistant in the Tokyo University of Arts and Sciences (now University of Tsukuba). After his last paper was published, he left for Manchuria at the age of 25 in 1938, then ruled by Japan, and worked as a bureaucrat there. With the defeat of Japan in 1945, the Soviets took control of Manchuria and Nakasawa was carted off to Siberia. He died of dystrophia at the age of 33 in Khabarovsk in the Soviet Union in 1946.
