= Free matroid =

The graphic matroid of a forest with 4 edges, which is the free matroid with a ground set of size 4 (also the uniform matroid $U{}^4_4$). More generally, the graphic matroid of a forest with n edges is $U{}^{n}_{n}$.

In mathematics, the free matroid over a given ground-set E is the matroid in which the independent sets are all subsets of E. It is a special case of a uniform matroid; specifically, when E has cardinality $n$, it is the uniform matroid $U{}^{n}_{n}$. The unique basis of this matroid is the ground-set itself, E. Among matroids on E, the free matroid on E has the most independent sets, the highest rank, and the fewest circuits.

Every free matroid with a ground set of size n is the graphic matroid of an n-edge forest.

== Free extension of a matroid ==
The free extension of a matroid $M$ by some element $e\not\in M$, denoted $M+e$, is a matroid whose elements are the elements of $M$ plus the new element $e$, and:

- Its circuits are the circuits of $M$ plus the sets $B\cup \{e\}$ for all bases $B$ of $M$.
- Equivalently, its independent sets are the independent sets of $M$ plus the sets $I\cup \{e\}$ for all independent sets $I$ that are not bases.
- Equivalently, its bases are the bases of $M$ plus the sets $I\cup \{e\}$ for all independent sets of size $\text{rank}(M)-1$.
