= Independence system =

In combinatorial mathematics, an independence system $S$ is a pair $(V, \mathcal{I})$, where $V$ is a finite set and $\mathcal{I}$ is a collection of subsets of $V$ (called the independent sets or feasible sets) with the following properties:

1. The empty set is independent, i.e., $\emptyset\in\mathcal{I}$. (Alternatively, at least one subset of $V$ is independent, i.e., $\mathcal{I}\neq\emptyset$.)
2. Every subset of an independent set is independent, i.e., for each $Y\subseteq X$, we have $X\in\mathcal{I}\Rightarrow Y\in\mathcal{I}$. This is sometimes called the hereditary property, or downward-closedness.

Another term for an independence system is an abstract simplicial complex.

== Relation to other concepts ==
- A pair $(V, \mathcal{I})$, where $V$ is a finite set and $\mathcal{I}$ is a collection of subsets of $V$, is also called a hypergraph. When using this terminology, the elements in the set $V$ are called vertices and elements in the family $\mathcal{I}$ are called hyperedges. So an independence system can be defined shortly as a downward-closed hypergraph.
- An independence system with an additional property called the augmentation property or the independent set exchange property yields a matroid. The following expression summarizes the relations between the terms:
  HYPERGRAPHS ⊃ INDEPENDENCE-SYSTEMS = ABSTRACT-SIMPLICIAL-COMPLEXES ⊃ MATROIDS.
