= Binary matroid =

Abstraction of mod-2 vector independence

In matroid theory, a binary matroid is a matroid that can be represented over the finite field GF(2). That is, up to isomorphism, they are the matroids whose elements are the columns of a (0,1)-matrix and whose sets of elements are independent if and only if the corresponding columns are linearly independent in GF(2).

== Alternative characterizations ==
A matroid $M$ is binary if and only if

- It is the matroid defined from a symmetric (0,1)-matrix.
- For every set $\mathcal{S}$ of circuits of the matroid, the symmetric difference of the circuits in $\mathcal{S}$ can be represented as a disjoint union of circuits.
- For every pair of circuits of the matroid, their symmetric difference contains another circuit.
- For every pair $C,D$ where $C$ is a circuit of $M$ and $D$ is a circuit of the dual matroid of $M$, $|C\cap D|$ is an even number.
- For every pair $B,C$ where $B$ is a basis of $M$ and $C$ is a circuit of $M$, $C$ is the symmetric difference of the fundamental circuits induced in $B$ by the elements of $C\setminus B$.
- No matroid minor of $M$ is the uniform matroid $U{}^2_4$, the four-point line.
- In the geometric lattice associated to the matroid, every interval of height two has at most five elements.

== Related matroids ==
Every regular matroid, and every graphic matroid, is binary. A binary matroid is regular if and only if it does not contain the Fano plane (a seven-element non-regular binary matroid) or its dual as a minor. A binary matroid is graphic if and only if its minors do not include the dual of the graphic matroid of $K_5$ nor of $K_{3,3}$. If every circuit of a binary matroid has odd cardinality, then its circuits must all be disjoint from each other; in this case, it may be represented as the graphic matroid of a cactus graph.

== Additional properties ==
If $M$ is a binary matroid, then so is its dual, and so is every minor of $M$. Additionally, the direct sum of binary matroids is binary.

Harary & Welsh (1969) define a bipartite matroid to be a matroid in which every circuit has even cardinality, and an Eulerian matroid to be a matroid in which the elements can be partitioned into disjoint circuits. Within the class of graphic matroids, these two properties describe the matroids of bipartite graphs and Eulerian graphs (not-necessarily-connected graphs in which all vertices have even degree), respectively. For planar graphs (and therefore also for the graphic matroids of planar graphs) these two properties are dual: a planar graph or its matroid is bipartite if and only if its dual is Eulerian. The same is true for binary matroids. However, there exist non-binary matroids for which this duality breaks down.

Any algorithm that tests whether a given matroid is binary, given access to the matroid via an independence oracle, must perform an exponential number of oracle queries, and therefore cannot take polynomial time.
