= Matroid minor =

Matroid obtained by restrictions and contractions

In the mathematical theory of matroids, a minor of a matroid M is another matroid N that is obtained from M by a sequence of restriction and contraction operations. Matroid minors are closely related to graph minors, and the restriction and contraction operations by which they are formed correspond to edge deletion and edge contraction operations in graphs. The theory of matroid minors leads to structural decompositions of matroids, and characterizations of matroid families by forbidden minors, analogous to the corresponding theory in graphs.

== Definitions ==
If M is a matroid on the set E and S is a subset of E, then the restriction of M to S, written M |S, is the matroid on the set S whose independent sets are the independent sets of M that are contained in S. Its circuits are the circuits of M that are contained in S and its rank function is that of M restricted to subsets of S.

If T is an independent subset of E, the contraction of M by T, written M/T, is the matroid on the underlying set E − T whose independent sets are the sets whose union with T is independent in M. This definition may be extended to arbitrary T by choosing a basis for T and defining a set to be independent in the contraction if its union with this basis remains independent in M. The rank function of the contraction is $r'(A) = r(A \cup T) - r(T).$

A matroid N is a minor of a matroid M if it can be constructed from M by restriction and contraction operations.

In terms of the geometric lattice formed by the flats of a matroid, taking a minor of a matroid corresponds to taking an interval of the lattice, the part of the lattice lying between a given lower bound and upper bound element.

== Forbidden matroid characterizations ==
Many important families of matroids are closed under the operation of taking minors: if a matroid M belongs to the family, then every minor of M also belongs to the family. In this case, the family may be characterized by its set of "forbidden matroids", the minor-minimal matroids that do not belong to the family. A matroid belongs to the family if and only if it does not have a forbidden matroid as a minor. Often, but not always, the set of forbidden matroids is finite, paralleling the Robertson–Seymour theorem which states that the set of forbidden minors of a minor-closed graph family is always finite.

An example of this phenomenon is given by the regular matroids, matroids that are representable over all fields. Equivalently a matroid is regular if it can be represented by a totally unimodular matrix (a matrix whose square submatrices all have determinants equal to 0, 1, or −1). Tutte (1958) proved that a matroid is regular if and only if it does not have one of three forbidden minors: the uniform matroid $U{}^2_4$ (the four-point line), the Fano plane, or the dual matroid of the Fano plane. For this he used his difficult homotopy theorem. Simpler proofs have since been found.

The graphic matroids, matroids whose independent sets are the forest subgraphs of a graph, have five forbidden minors: the three for the regular matroids, and the two duals of the graphic matroids for the graphs K_{5} and K_{3,3} that by Wagner's theorem are forbidden minors for the planar graphs.

The binary matroids, matroids representable over the two-element finite field, include both graphic and regular matroids. Tutte again showed that these matroids have a forbidden minor characterization: they are the matroids that do not have the four-point line as a minor. Rota conjectured that, for any finite field, the matroids representable over that field have finitely many forbidden minors. A proof of this conjecture was announced, but not published, by Geelen, Gerards, and Whittle in 2014. The matroids that can be represented over the real numbers have infinitely many forbidden minors.

== Branchwidth ==
Branch-decompositions of matroids may be defined analogously to their definition for graphs. A branch-decomposition of a matroid is a hierarchical clustering of the matroid elements, represented as an unrooted binary tree with the elements of the matroid at its leaves. Removing any edge of this tree partitions the matroids into two disjoint subsets; such a partition is called an e-separation. If r denotes the rank function of the matroid, then the width of an e-separation is defined as r(A) + r(B) − r(M) + 1. The width of a decomposition is the maximum width of any of its e-separations, and the branchwidth of a matroid is the minimum width of any of its branch-decompositions.

The branchwidth of a graph and the branchwidth of the corresponding graphic matroid may differ: for instance, the three-edge path graph and the three-edge star have different branchwidths, 2 and 1 respectively, but they both induce the same graphic matroid with branchwidth 1. However, for graphs that are not trees, the branchwidth of the graph is equal to the branchwidth of its associated graphic matroid. The branchwidth of a matroid always equals the branchwidth of its dual.

Branchwidth is an important component of attempts to extend the theory of graph minors to matroids: although treewidth can also be generalized to matroids, and plays a bigger role than branchwidth in the theory of graph minors, branchwidth has more convenient properties in the matroid setting. If a minor-closed family of matroids representable over a finite field does not include the graphic matroids of all planar graphs, then there is a constant bound on the branchwidth of the matroids in the family, generalizing similar results for minor-closed graph families.

== Well-quasi-ordering ==
The Robertson–Seymour theorem implies that every matroid property of graphic matroids characterized by a list of forbidden minors can be characterized by a finite list. Another way of saying the same thing is that the partial order on graphic matroids formed by the minor operation is a well-quasi-ordering. However, the example of the real-representable matroids, which have infinitely many forbidden minors, shows that the minor ordering is not a well-quasi-ordering on all matroids.

Robertson and Seymour conjectured that the matroids representable over any particular finite field are well-quasi-ordered. So far this has been proven only for the matroids of bounded branchwidth.

== Matroid decompositions ==
The graph structure theorem is an important tool in the theory of graph minors, according to which the graphs in any minor-closed family can be built up from simpler graphs by clique-sum operations. Some analogous results are also known in matroid theory. In particular, Seymour's decomposition theorem states that all regular matroids can be built up in a simple way as the clique-sum of graphic matroids, their duals, and one special 10-element matroid. As a consequence, linear programs defined by totally unimodular matrices may be solved combinatorially by combining the solutions to a set of minimum spanning tree problems corresponding to the graphic and co-graphic parts of this decomposition.

== Algorithms and complexity ==
One of the important components of graph minor theory is the existence of an algorithm for testing whether a graph H is a minor of another graph G, taking an amount of time that is polynomial in G for any fixed choice of H (and more strongly fixed-parameter tractable if the size of H is allowed to vary). By combining this result with the Robertson–Seymour theorem, it is possible to recognize the members of any minor-closed graph family in polynomial time. Correspondingly, in matroid theory, it would be desirable to develop efficient algorithms for recognizing whether a given fixed matroid is a minor of an input matroid. Unfortunately, such a strong result is not possible: in the matroid oracle model, the only minors that can be recognized in polynomial time are the uniform matroids with rank or corank one. However, if the problem is restricted to the matroids that are representable over some fixed finite field (and represented as a matrix over that field) then, as in the graph case, it is conjectured to be possible to recognize the matroids that contain any fixed minor in polynomial time.
