= Heiko Harborth =

German mathematician

- Born: 11 February 1938; Celle, Germany
- Education: Braunschweig University of Technology
- Known for: number theory, combinatorics, and discrete geometry
- Awards: Euler Medal (2007)
- Scientific career
- Fields: Mathematics
- Workplaces: Braunschweig University of Technology
- Doctoral advisor: Hans-Joachim Kanold

Heiko Harborth (born 11 February 1938, in Celle, Germany) is Professor of Mathematics at Braunschweig University of Technology, 1975–present, and author of more than 188 mathematical publications. His work is mostly in the areas of number theory, combinatorics and discrete geometry, including graph theory.

== Career ==
Harborth has been an instructor or professor at Braunschweig University of Technology since studying there and receiving his PhD in 1965 under Hans-Joachim Kanold. Harborth is a member of the New York Academy of Sciences, Braunschweigische Wissenschaftliche Gesellschaft, the Institute of Combinatorics and its Applications, and many other mathematical societies. Harborth currently sits on the editorial boards of Fibonacci Quarterly, Geombinatorics, Integers: Electronic Journal of Combinatorial Number Theory. He served as an editor of Mathematische Semesterberichte from 1988 to 2001. Harborth was a joint recipient (with Stephen Milne) of the 2007 Euler Medal.

== Mathematical work ==
The Harborth Graph.

Harborth's research ranges across the subject areas of combinatorics, graph theory, discrete geometry, and number theory. In 1974, Harborth solved the unit coin graph problem, determining the maximum number of edges possible in a unit coin graph on n vertices. In 1986, Harborth presented the graph that would bear his name, the Harborth graph. It is the smallest known example of a 4-regular matchstick graph. It has 104 edges and 52 vertices.

In connection with the happy ending problem, Harborth showed that, for every finite set of ten or more points in general position in the plane, some five of them form a convex pentagon that does not contain any of the other points.

Harborth's conjecture posits that every planar graph admits a straight-line embedding in the plane where every edge has integer length. This open question (as of 2014) is a stronger version of Fáry's theorem. It is known to be true for cubic graphs.

In number theory, the Stolarsky–Harborth constant is named for Harborth, along with Kenneth Stolarsky.

== Private life ==
Harborth married Karin Reisener in 1961, and they had two children. He was widowed in 1980. In 1985 he married Bärbel Peter and with her has three stepchildren.
