= The Mathematical Coloring Book =

Book on graph coloring and Ramsey theory

- Author: Alexander Soifer
- Publisher: Springer
- ISBN: 978-0-387-74640-1

The Mathematical Coloring Book: Mathematics of Coloring and the Colorful Life of Its Creators is a book on graph coloring, Ramsey theory, and the history of development of these areas, concentrating in particular on the Hadwiger–Nelson problem and on the biography of Bartel Leendert van der Waerden. It was written by Alexander Soifer and published by Springer-Verlag in 2009.

The book has since been updated: The New Mathematical Coloring Book: Mathematics of Coloring and the Colorful Life of Its Creators was published in 2024.

== Topics ==
The book "presents mathematics as a human endeavor" and "explores the birth of ideas and moral dilemmas of the times between and during the two World Wars". As such, as well as covering the mathematics of its topics, it includes biographical material and correspondence with many of the people involved in creating it, including in-depth coverage of Issai Schur, Pierre Joseph Henry Baudet, and Bartel Leendert van der Waerden, in particular studying the question of van der Warden's complicity with the Nazis in his war-time service as a professor in Nazi Germany. It also includes biographical material on Paul Erdős, Frank P. Ramsey, Emmy Noether, Alfred Brauer, Richard Courant, Kenneth Falconer, Nicolas de Bruijn, Hillel Furstenberg, and Tibor Gallai, among others, as well as many historical photos of these subjects.

Mathematically, the book considers problems "on the boundary of geometry, combinatorics, and number theory", involving graph coloring problems such as the four color theorem, and generalizations of coloring in Ramsey theory where the use of a too-small number of colors leads to monochromatic structures larger than a single graph edge. Central to the book is the Hadwiger–Nelson problem, the problem of coloring the points of the Euclidean plane in such a way that no two points of the same color are a unit distance apart. Other topics covered by the book include Van der Waerden's theorem on monochromatic arithmetic progressions in colorings of the integers and its generalization to Szemerédi's theorem, the Happy ending problem, Rado's theorem, and questions in the foundations of mathematics involving the possibility that different choices of foundational axioms will lead to different answers to some of the coloring questions considered here.

== Reception and audience ==
As a work in graph theory, reviewer Joseph Malkevitch suggests caution over the book's intuitive treatment of graphs that may in many cases be infinite, in comparison with much other work in this area that makes an implicit assumption that every graph is finite. William Gasarch is surprised by the book's omission of some closely related topics, including the proof of the Heawood conjecture on coloring graphs on surfaces by Gerhard Ringel and Ted Youngs. And Günter M. Ziegler complains that many claims are presented without proof. Although Soifer has called the Hadwiger–Nelson problem "the most important problem in all of mathematics", Ziegler disagrees, and suggests that it and the four color theorem are too isolated to be fruitful topics of study.

As a work in the history of mathematics, Malkevitch finds the book too credulous of first-person recollections of troubled political times (the lead-up to World War II) and of priority in mathematical discoveries. Ziegler points to several errors of fact in the book's history, takes issue with its insistence that each contribution should be attributed to only one researcher, and doubts Soifer's objectivity with respect to van der Waerden. And reviewer John J. Watkins writes that "Soifer’s book is indeed a treasure trove filled with valuable historical and mathematical information, but a serious reader must also be prepared to sift through a considerable amount of dross" to reach the treasure. And although Watkins is convinced by Soifer's argument that the first conjectural versions of van der Waerden's theorem were due to Schur and Baudet, he finds idiosyncratic Soifer's insistence that this updated credit necessitates a change in the name of the theorem, concluding that "This is a book that needed far better editing." Ziegler agrees, writing "Someone should have also forced him to cut the manuscript, at the long parts and chapters where the investigations into the colorful lives of the creators get out of hand."

According to Malkevitch, the book is written for a broad audience, and does not require a graduate-level background in its material, but nevertheless contains much that is of interest to experts as well as beginners. And despite his negative review, Ziegler concurs, writing that it "has interesting parts and a lot of valuable material". Gasarch is much more enthusiastic, writing "This is a Fantastic Book! Go buy it Now!".
