= Unit distance =

Unit distance may refer to:

- Astronomical unit: the distance to the Sun
- Unit distance graph: a graph whose lines connect points that must be a distance apart that is equal to one
- Unit interval: the set of all real-numbered points on the closed interval [0,1]
- Unit vector: a vector normalized to length one for analytical purposes
