= Cubic lattice =

Cubic lattice may refer to:

- Cubic crystal system
- Cubic honeycomb vertex arrangement
- Integer lattice Z^{3}
