= Stephen Milne (disambiguation) =

Stephen Milne (born 1980) is a retired Australian rules footballer.

Stephen or Steven Milne may also refer to:

- Steven Milne (born 1980), retired Scottish association footballer
- Stephen Milne (mathematician), American mathematician
- Stephen Milne (sailor), Irish sailor
- Stephen Milne (swimmer) (born 1994), Scottish swimmer
- Stephen Milne, cellist who appeared on No Quarter: Jimmy Page and Robert Plant Unledded
