= Moser spindle =

Undirected unit-distance graph requiring four colors

- Named after: Leo Moser, William Moser
- Vertices: 7
- Edges: 11
- Radius: 2
- Diameter: 2
- Girth: 3
- Automorphisms: 8
- Chromatic number: 4
- Chromatic index: 4
- Properties: planar unit distance Laman graph

In graph theory, a branch of mathematics, the Moser spindle (also called the Mosers' spindle or Moser graph) is an undirected graph, named after mathematicians Leo Moser and his brother William, with seven vertices and eleven edges. It can be drawn as a unit distance graph, and it requires four colors in any graph coloring. Its existence can be used to prove that the chromatic number of the plane is at least four.

The Moser spindle has also been called the Hajós graph after György Hajós, as it can be viewed as an instance of the Hajós construction. However, the name "Hajós graph" has also been applied to a different graph, in the form of a triangle inscribed within a hexagon.

== Construction ==
The Moser spindle embedded as a unit distance graph in the plane, together with a seven-coloring of the plane.

As a unit distance graph, the Moser spindle is formed by two rhombi with 60 and 120 degree angles, so that the sides and short diagonals of the rhombi form equilateral triangles. The two rhombi are placed in the plane, sharing one of their acute-angled vertices, in such a way that the remaining two acute-angled vertices are a unit distance apart from each other. The eleven edges of the graph are the eight rhombus sides, the two short diagonals of the rhombi, and the edge between the unit-distance pair of acute-angled vertices.

Hajós construction of the Moser spindle

The Moser spindle may also be constructed graph-theoretically, without reference to a geometric embedding, using the Hajós construction starting with two complete graphs on four vertices. This construction removes an edge from each complete graph, merges two of the endpoints of the removed edges into a single vertex shared by both cliques, and adds a new edge connecting the remaining two endpoints of the removed edge.

Another way of constructing the Moser spindle is as the complement graph of the graph formed from the utility graph K_{3,3} by subdividing one of its edges.

== Application to the Hadwiger–Nelson problem ==
The Hadwiger–Nelson problem asks how many colors are needed to color the points of the Euclidean plane in such a way that each pair of points at unit distance from each other are assigned different colors. That is, it asks for the chromatic number of the infinite graph whose vertices are all the points in the plane and whose edges are all pairs of points at unit distance.

The Moser spindle requires four colors in any graph coloring: in any three-coloring of one of the two rhombi from which it is formed, the two acute-angled vertices of the rhombi would necessarily have the same color as each other. But if the shared vertex of the two rhombi has the same color as the two opposite acute-angled vertices, then these two vertices have the same color as each other, violating the requirement that the edge connecting them have differently-colored endpoints. This contradiction shows that three colors are impossible, so at least four colors are necessary. Four colors are also sufficient to color the Moser spindle, a fact that follows for instance from the fact that its degeneracy is three.

An alternative proof that the Moser spindle requires four colors follows from the Hajós construction. Both of the complete graphs from which the Moser spindle is formed require four colors, and the Hajós construction preserves this property. Even more directly, each independent set in the Moser spindle has at most two vertices, so it takes at least four independent sets to cover all seven vertices.

Since the Moser spindle is a subgraph of the infinite unit distance graph of the plane, the graph of the plane also requires at least four colors in any coloring. By the de Bruijn–Erdős theorem (with the assumption that the axiom of choice is true), the chromatic number of the plane is the same as the largest chromatic number of any of its finite subgraphs; until the discovery of a family of 5-chromatic unit distance graphs in 2018, no subgraph of the infinite unit distance graph had been found that requires a larger number of colors than the Moser spindle. However, the best upper bound for the chromatic number of the plane is seven, significantly higher than the number of colors required for the Moser spindle.

== Other properties and applications ==
The Moser spindle is a planar graph, meaning that it can be drawn without crossings in the plane. However, it is not possible to form such a drawing with straight line edges that is also a unit distance drawing; that is, it is not a matchstick graph. The Moser spindle is also a Laman graph, meaning that it forms a minimally rigid system when embedded in the plane. As a planar Laman graph, it is the graph of a pointed pseudotriangulation, meaning that it can be embedded in the plane in such a way that the unbounded face is the convex hull of the embedding and every bounded face is a pseudotriangle with only three convex vertices.

The complement graph of the Moser graph is a triangle-free graph. Thus, the unit distance embedding of the Moser graph may be used to solve the problem of placing seven points in the plane in such a way that every triple of points contains at least one pair at unit distance from each other.

Adding any edge to the Moser spindle results in a graph that cannot be embedded in the plane as a unit distance graph, and there does not exist a graph homomorphism from the Moser spindle to any smaller unit distance graph. These two properties of the Moser spindle were used by Horvat, Kratochvíl & Pisanski (2011) to show the NP-hardness of testing whether a given graph has a two-dimensional unit distance representation; the proof uses a reduction from 3SAT in which the Moser spindle is used as the central truth-setting gadget in the reduction.

The Moser spindle can also be used to prove a result in Euclidean Ramsey theory: if T is any triangle in the plane, and the points of the plane are two-colored black and white, then there is either a black translate of T or a pair of white points at unit distance from each other. For, let M be a unit-distance embedding of the Moser spindle, and let M + T be the Minkowski sum of M and T. If M + T has no white unit-distance pair, then each of the three copies of the Moser spindle in M + T must have at most two white points, because the white points in each copy must form an independent set and the largest independent set in the Moser spindle has size two. Therefore, among the seven vertices of the Moser spindle, there are at most six that have a white copy in M + T, so there must be one of the seven vertices all of whose copies are black. But then the three copies of this vertex form a translate of T.

== See also ==
- Golomb graph
