= Critical graph =

Undirected graph

On the left-top a vertex critical graph with chromatic number 6; next all the N-1 subgraphs with chromatic number 5.

In graph theory, a critical graph is an undirected graph all of whose proper subgraphs have smaller chromatic number. In such a graph, every vertex or edge is a critical element, in the sense that its deletion would decrease the number of colors needed in a graph coloring of the given graph. Each time a single edge or vertex (along with its incident edges) is removed from a critical graph, the decrease in the number of colors needed to color that graph cannot be by more than one.

== Variations ==
A $k$-critical graph is a critical graph with chromatic number $k$. A graph $G$ with chromatic number $k$ is $k$-vertex-critical if each of its vertices is a critical element. Critical graphs are the minimal members in terms of chromatic number, which is a very important measure in graph theory.

Some properties of a $k$-critical graph $G$ with $n$ vertices and $m$ edges:

- $G$ has only one component.
- $G$ is finite (this is the De Bruijn–Erdős theorem).
- The minimum degree $\delta(G)$ obeys the inequality $\delta(G)\ge k-1$. That is, every vertex is adjacent to at least $k-1$ others. More strongly, $G$ is $(k-1)$-edge-connected.
- If $G$ is a regular graph with degree $k-1$, meaning every vertex is adjacent to exactly $k-1$ others, then $G$ is either the complete graph $K_k$ with $n=k$ vertices, or an odd-length cycle graph. This is Brooks' theorem.
- $2m\ge(k-1)n+k-3$.
- $2m\ge (k-1)n+(k-3)/(k^2-3)n$.
- Either $G$ may be decomposed into two smaller critical graphs, with an edge between every pair of vertices that includes one vertex from each of the two subgraphs, or $G$ has at least $2k-1$ vertices. More strongly, either $G$ has a decomposition of this type, or for every vertex $v$ of $G$ there is a $k$-coloring in which $v$ is the only vertex of its color and every other color class has at least two vertices.

Graph $G$ is vertex-critical if and only if for every vertex $v$, there is an optimal proper coloring in which $v$ is a singleton color class.

Dirac's critical-graph conjecture asks whether, for every integer k ≥ 4, there is a k-vertex-critical graph with no critical edge. Tommy R. Jensen established this for every k ≥ 5 in 2002; a 2026 working paper by Alex Chan completes the conjecture by offering a construction for the remaining case k = 4.

As Hajós (1961) showed, every $k$-critical graph may be formed from a complete graph $K_k$ by combining the Hajós construction with an operation that identifies two non-adjacent vertices. The graphs formed in this way always require $k$ colors in any proper coloring.

A double-critical graph is a connected graph in which the deletion of any pair of adjacent vertices decreases the chromatic number by two. It is an open problem to determine whether $K_k$ is the only double-critical $k$-chromatic graph (as claimed by the Erdös-Lovász double critical conjecture).

== See also ==
- Factor-critical graph
