= Erdős–Ulam problem =

Does the plane contains a dense set of points whose distances are all rational

Unsolved problem in mathematics
Is there a dense set of points in the plane at rational distances from each other?
More unsolved problems in mathematics

In mathematics, the Erdős–Ulam problem asks whether the plane contains a dense set of points whose Euclidean distances are all rational numbers. It is named after Paul Erdős and Stanislaw Ulam.

== Large point sets with rational distances ==
The Erdős–Anning theorem states that a set of points with integer distances must either be finite or lie on a single line. However, there are other infinite sets of points with rational distances. For instance, on the unit circle, let S be the set of points

$$(\cos\theta,\sin\theta)$$

where $\theta$ is restricted to values that cause $\tan\tfrac{\theta}{4}$ to be a rational number. For each such point, both $\sin\tfrac{\theta}{2}$ and $\cos\tfrac\theta 2$ are themselves both rational, and if $\theta$ and $\varphi$ define two points in S, then their distance is the rational number

$$\left| 2\sin\frac \theta 2 \cos\frac \varphi 2 -2\sin\frac \varphi 2 \cos\frac \theta 2 \right|.$$

More generally, a circle with radius $\rho$ contains a dense set of points at rational distances to each other if and only if $\rho^2$ is rational. However, these sets are only dense on their circle, not dense on the whole plane.

== History and partial results ==
In 1946, Stanislaw Ulam asked whether there exists a set of points at rational distances from each other that forms a dense subset of the Euclidean plane. While the answer to this question is still open, József Solymosi and Frank de Zeeuw showed that the only irreducible algebraic curves that contain infinitely many points at rational distances are lines and circles. Terence Tao and Jafar Shaffaf independently observed that, if the Bombieri–Lang conjecture is true, the same methods would show that there is no infinite dense set of points at rational distances in the plane. Using different methods, Hector Pasten proved that the abc conjecture also implies a negative solution to the Erdős–Ulam problem.

== Consequences ==
If the Erdős–Ulam problem has a positive solution, it would provide a counterexample to the Bombieri–Lang conjecture and to the abc conjecture. It would also solve Harborth's conjecture, on the existence of drawings of planar graphs in which all distances are integers. If a dense rational-distance set exists, any straight-line drawing of a planar graph could be perturbed by a small amount (without introducing crossings) to use points from this set as its vertices, and then scaled to make the distances integers. However, like the Erdős–Ulam problem, Harborth's conjecture remains unproven.
