= Hamming graph =

Cartesian product of complete graphs

- Named after: Richard Hamming
- Vertices: q^{d}
- Edges: $\frac{d(q-1)q^d}{2}$
- Diameter: d
- Spectrum: $\{(d (q - 1) - q i)^{\binom{d}{i} (q - 1)^i};$$i = 0, \ldots, d\}$
- Properties: d(q − 1)-regular Vertex-transitive; Distance-regular; Distance-balanced; Polytopal
- Notation: H(d,q)

H(3,3) drawn as a unit distance graph

Hamming graphs are a special class of graphs named after Richard Hamming and used in several branches of mathematics (graph theory) and computer science. Let S be a set of q elements and d a positive integer. The Hamming graph H(d,q) has vertex set S^{d}, the set of ordered d-tuples of elements of S, or sequences of length d from S. Two vertices are adjacent if they differ in precisely one coordinate; that is, if their Hamming distance is one. The Hamming graph H(d,q) is, equivalently, the Cartesian product of d complete graphs K_{q}.

In some cases, Hamming graphs may be considered more generally as the Cartesian products of complete graphs that may be of varying sizes. Unlike the Hamming graphs H(d,q), the graphs in this more general class are not necessarily distance-regular, but they continue to be regular and vertex-transitive.

== Special cases ==
- H(2,3), which is the generalized quadrangle G Q (2,1)
- H(1,q), which is the complete graph K_{q}
- H(2,q), which is the lattice graph L_{q,q} and also the rook's graph
- H(d,1), which is the singleton graph K_{1}
- H(d,2), which is the hypercube graph Q_{d}. Hamiltonian paths in these graphs form Gray codes.
- Because Cartesian products of graphs preserve the property of being a unit distance graph, the Hamming graphs H(d,2) and H(d,3) are all unit distance graphs.

== Applications ==
The Hamming graphs are interesting in connection with error-correcting codes and association schemes, to name two areas. They have also been considered as a communications network topology in distributed computing.

== Computational complexity ==
It is possible in linear time to test whether a graph is a Hamming graph, and in the case that it is, find a labeling of it with tuples that realizes it as a Hamming graph.
