= Generalized Petersen graph =

Family of cubic graphs formed from regular and star polygons

The Dürer graph G(6, 2).

In graph theory, the generalized Petersen graphs are a family of cubic graphs formed by connecting the vertices of a regular polygon to the corresponding vertices of a star polygon. They include the Petersen graph and generalize one of the ways of constructing the Petersen graph. The generalized Petersen graph family was introduced in 1950 by H. S. M. Coxeter and was given its name in 1969 by Mark Watkins.

== Definition and notation ==
In Watkins' notation, $G(n,k)$ is a graph with vertex set
$$\{u_0, u_1, \ldots, u_{n-1}, v_0, v_1, \ldots, v_{n-1}\}$$
and edge set
$$\{u_iu_{i+1}, u_iv_i, v_iv_{i+k} \mid 0 \le i \le n-1 \}$$
where subscripts are to be read modulo $n$ and where $k<n/2$. Some authors use the notation $GPG(n,k)$. Coxeter's notation for the same graph would be $\{n\}+\{n/k\}$, a combination of the Schläfli symbols for the regular n-gon and star polygon from which the graph is formed. The Petersen graph itself is $G(5,2)$ or $\{5\}+\{5/2\}$. Some authors also allow $k=n/2$, producing a graph that is not a regular graph.

Any generalized Petersen graph can also be constructed from a voltage graph with two vertices, two self-loops, and one other edge.

== Examples ==
Among the generalized Petersen graphs are the $n$-prism $G(n,1)$, the Dürer graph $G(6,2)$, the Möbius-Kantor graph $G(8,3)$, the dodecahedron $G(10,2)$, the Desargues graph $G(10,3)$ and the Nauru graph $G(12,5)$.

Four generalized Petersen graphs – the 3-prism, the 5-prism, the Dürer graph, and $G(7,2)$ – are among the seven graphs that are cubic, 3-vertex-connected, and well-covered (meaning that all of their maximal independent sets have equal size).

== Properties ==
One of the three Hamiltonian cycles in G(9, 2). The other two Hamiltonian cycles in the same graph are symmetric under 40° rotations of the drawing.

This family of graphs possesses a number of interesting properties. For example:

- $G(n,k)$ is vertex-transitive (meaning that it has symmetries that take any vertex to any other vertex) if and only if $(n,k)=(10,2)$ or $k^2\equiv\pm1\ (\mathrm{mod}\ n)$.
- $G(n,k)$ is edge-transitive (having symmetries that take any edge to any other edge) only in the following seven cases: $(n,k)$ is (4, 1), (5, 2), (8, 3), (10, 2), (10, 3), (12, 5), or (24, 5). These seven graphs are therefore the only symmetric generalized Petersen graphs.
- $G(n,k)$ is bipartite if and only if $n$ is even and $k$ is odd.
- $G(n,k)$ is a Cayley graph if and only if $k^2\equiv 1\ (\mathrm{mod}\ n)$.
- $G(n,k)$ is hypohamiltonian when $n$ is congruent to 5 modulo 6 and $k$ is 2, $n-2$, or $(n\pm1)/2$ (these four choices of k lead to isomorphic graphs). It is also non-Hamiltonian when $n$ is divisible by 4, at least equal to 8, and $k=n/2$. In all other cases it has a Hamiltonian cycle. When $n$ is congruent to 3 modulo 6, $G(n,2)$ has exactly three Hamiltonian cycles. For $G(n,2)$, the number of Hamiltonian cycles can be computed by a formula that depends on the congruence class of $n$ modulo 6 and involves the Fibonacci numbers. Linear recurrence relations for the number of Hamiltonian cycles have also been found for $G(n,3)$ and $G(n,4)$.
- Every generalized Petersen graph is a unit distance graph.

=== Isomorphisms ===
$G(n,k)$ is isomorphic to $G(n,\ell)$ if and only if $k\equiv\pm\ell\ (\mathrm{mod}\ n)$ or $k\ell\equiv\pm1\ (\mathrm{mod}\ n)$.

=== Girth ===
The girth of $G(n,k)$ is at least 3 and at most 8, in particular:

$$g(G(n,k)) \le \min \left \{8,k+3,\frac{n}{\gcd(n,k)} \right \}.$$

A table with exact girth values:

Condition	Girth
$n=3k$	3
$n=4k$	4
$k=1$	4
$n=5k$	5
$n=5k/2$	5
$k=2$	5
$n=6k$	6
$k=3$	6
$n=2k+2$	6
$n=7k$	7
$n=7k/2$	7
$n=7k/3$	7
$k=4$	7
$n=2k+3$	7
$n=3k\pm2$	7
otherwise	8

=== Chromatic number and chromatic index ===
Generalized Petersen graphs are regular graphs of degree three, so according to Brooks' theorem their chromatic number can only be two or three. More exactly:

$$\chi(G(n,k))= \begin{cases}
2 & 2 \mid n \land 2 \nmid k \\
3 & 2 \nmid n \lor 2 \mid k \\
\end{cases}$$

Where $\land$ denotes the logical AND, while $\lor$ the logical OR. Here, $\mid$ denotes divisibility, and $\nmid$ denotes its negation. For example, the chromatic number of $G(5,2)$ is 3.

A 3-coloring of the Petersen graph or $G(5,2)$

A 2-coloring of the Desargues graph or $G(10,3)$

A 3-coloring of the Dürer graph or $G(6,2)$

The Petersen graph, being a snark, has a chromatic index of 4: its edges require four colors. All other generalized Petersen graphs have chromatic index 3. These are the only possibilities, by Vizing's theorem.

The generalized Petersen graph $G(9,2)$ is one of the few graphs known to have only one 3-edge-coloring.

A 4-edge-coloring of the Petersen graph or $G(5,2)$

A 3-edge-coloring of the Dürer graph or $G(6,2)$

A 3-edge-coloring of the dodecahedron or $G(10,2)$

A 3-edge-coloring of the Desargues graph or $G(10,3)$

A 3-edge-coloring of the Nauru graph or $G(12,5)$

The Petersen graph itself is the only generalized Petersen graph that is not 3-edge-colorable.
