= De Bruijn–Erdős theorem (graph theory) =

On coloring infinite graphs

In graph theory, the De Bruijn–Erdős theorem relates graph coloring of an infinite graph to the same problem on its finite subgraphs. It states that, when all finite subgraphs can be colored with $c$ colors, the same is true for the whole graph. The theorem was proved by Nicolaas Govert de Bruijn and Paul Erdős, after whom it is named.

The De Bruijn–Erdős theorem has several different proofs, all depending in some way on the axiom of choice. Its applications include extending the four-color theorem and Dilworth's theorem from finite graphs and partially ordered sets to infinite ones, and reducing the Hadwiger–Nelson problem on the chromatic number of the plane to a problem about finite graphs. It may be generalized from finite numbers of colors to sets of colors whose cardinality is a strongly compact cardinal.

== Definitions and statement ==
An undirected graph is a mathematical object consisting of a set of vertices and a set of edges that link pairs of vertices. The two vertices associated with each edge are called its endpoints. The graph is finite when its vertices and edges form finite sets, and infinite otherwise. A graph coloring associates each vertex with a color drawn from a set of colors, in such a way that every edge has two different colors at its endpoints. A frequent goal in graph coloring is to minimize the total number of colors that are used; the chromatic number of a graph is this minimum number of colors. The four-color theorem states that every finite graph that can be drawn without crossings in the Euclidean plane needs at most four colors; however, some graphs with more complicated connectivity require more than four colors. It is a consequence of the axiom of choice that the chromatic number is well-defined for infinite graphs, but for these graphs the chromatic number might itself be an infinite cardinal number.

A subgraph of a graph is another graph obtained from a subset of its vertices and a subset of its edges. If the larger graph is colored, the same coloring can be used for the subgraph. Therefore, the chromatic number of a subgraph cannot be larger than the chromatic number of the whole graph. The De Bruijn–Erdős theorem concerns the chromatic numbers of infinite graphs, and shows that (again, assuming the axiom of choice) they can be calculated from the chromatic numbers of their finite subgraphs. It states that, if the chromatic numbers of the finite subgraphs of a graph $G$ have a finite maximum value $c$, then the chromatic number of $G$ itself is exactly $c$. On the other hand, if there is no finite upper bound on the chromatic numbers of the finite subgraphs of $G$, then the chromatic number of $G$ itself must be infinite.

== Applications ==
The original motivation of Erdős in studying this problem was to extend from finite to infinite graphs the theorem that, whenever a graph has an orientation with finite maximum out-degree $k$, it also has a $(2k+1)$-coloring. For finite graphs this follows because such graphs always have a vertex of degree at most $2k$, which can be colored with one of $2k+1$ colors after all the remaining vertices are colored recursively. Infinite graphs with such an orientation do not always have a low-degree vertex (for instance, Bethe lattices have $k=1$ but arbitrarily large minimum degree), so this argument requires the graph to be finite. But the De Bruijn–Erdős theorem shows that a $(2k+1)$-coloring exists even for infinite graphs.

A seven-coloring of the plane, and the four-chromatic Moser spindle drawn as a unit distance graph in the plane, providing upper and lower bounds for the Hadwiger–Nelson problem

Another application of the De Bruijn–Erdős theorem is to the Hadwiger–Nelson problem, which asks how many colors are needed to color the points of the Euclidean plane so that every two points that are a unit distance apart have different colors. This is a graph coloring problem for an infinite graph that has a vertex for every point of the plane and an edge for every two points whose Euclidean distance is exactly one. The induced subgraphs of this graph are called unit distance graphs. A seven-vertex unit distance graph, the Moser spindle, requires four colors; in 2018, much larger unit distance graphs were found that require five colors. The whole infinite graph has a known coloring with seven colors based on a hexagonal tiling of the plane. Therefore, the chromatic number of the plane must be either 5, 6, or 7, but it is not known which of these three numbers is the correct value. The De Bruijn–Erdős theorem shows that, for this problem, there exists a finite unit distance graph with the same chromatic number as the whole plane, so if the chromatic number is greater than five then this fact can be proved by a finite calculation.

The De Bruijn–Erdős theorem may also be used to extend Dilworth's theorem from finite to infinite partially ordered sets. Dilworth's theorem states that the width of a partial order (the maximum number of elements in a set of mutually incomparable elements) equals the minimum number of chains (totally ordered subsets) into which the partial order may be partitioned. A partition into chains may be interpreted as a coloring of the incomparability graph of the partial order. This is a graph with a vertex for each element of the order and an edge for each pair of incomparable elements. Using this coloring interpretation, together with a separate proof of Dilworth's theorem for finite partially ordered sets, it is possible to prove that an infinite partially ordered set has finite width $w$ if and only if it has a partition into $w$ chains.

In the same way, the De Bruijn–Erdős theorem extends the four-color theorem from finite planar graphs to infinite planar graphs. Every finite planar graph can be colored with four colors, by the four-color theorem. The De Bruijn–Erdős theorem then shows that every graph that can be drawn without crossings in the plane, finite or infinite, can be colored with four colors. More generally, every infinite graph for which all finite subgraphs are planar can again be four-colored.

== Proofs ==
The original proof of the De Bruijn–Erdős theorem, by De Bruijn, used transfinite induction.

Gottschalk (1951) provided the following very short proof, based on Tychonoff's theorem in topology. Suppose that, for the given infinite graph $G$, every finite subgraph is $k$-colorable, and let $X$ be the space of all assignments of the $k$ colors to the vertices of $G$ (regardless of whether they form a valid coloring). Then $X$ may be given a topology as a product space $k^{V(G)}$, where $V(G)$ denotes the set of vertices of the graph. By Tychonoff's theorem this topological space is compact. For each finite subgraph $F$ of $G$, let $X_F$ be the subset of $X$ consisting of assignments of colors that validly color $F$. Then the system of sets $X_F$ is a family of closed sets with the finite intersection property, so by compactness it has a nonempty intersection. Every member of this intersection is a valid coloring of $G$.

A different proof using Zorn's lemma was given by Lajos Pósa, and also in the 1951 Ph.D. thesis of Gabriel Andrew Dirac. If $G$ is an infinite graph in which every finite subgraph is $k$-colorable, then by Zorn's lemma it is a subgraph of a maximal graph $M$ with the same property (one to which no more edges may be added without causing some finite subgraph to require more than $k$ colors). The binary relation of nonadjacency in $M$ is an equivalence relation, and its equivalence classes provide a $k$-coloring of $G$. However, this proof is more difficult to generalize than the compactness proof.

The theorem can also be proved using ultrafilters or non-standard analysis. Nash-Williams (1967) gives a proof for graphs with a countable number of vertices based on Kőnig's infinity lemma.

== Dependence on choice ==
All proofs of the De Bruijn–Erdős theorem use some form of the axiom of choice. Some form of this assumption is necessary, as there exist models of mathematics in which both the axiom of choice and the De Bruijn–Erdős theorem are false. More precisely, Mycielski (1961) showed that the theorem is a consequence of the Boolean prime ideal theorem, a property that is implied by the axiom of choice but weaker than the full axiom of choice, and Läuchli (1971) showed that the De Bruijn–Erdős theorem and the Boolean prime ideal theorem are equivalent in axiomatic power. The De Bruijn–Erdős theorem for countable graphs can also be shown to be equivalent in axiomatic power, in second-order arithmetic, to a weak form of Kőnig's lemma stating that every infinite binary tree has an infinite branch and used to define the system WKL_{0}.

For a counterexample to the theorem in models of set theory without choice, let $G$ be an infinite graph in which the vertices represent all possible real numbers. In $G$, connect each two real numbers $x$ and $y$ by an edge whenever one of the values $|x-y|\pm\sqrt2$ is a rational number. Equivalently, in this graph, edges exist between all real numbers $x$ and all real numbers of the form $x+q\pm\sqrt2$, for rational numbers $q$. Each path in this graph, starting from any real number $x$, alternates between numbers that differ from $x$ by a rational number plus an even multiple of $\sqrt2$ and numbers that differ from $x$ by a rational number plus an odd multiple of $\sqrt2$. This alternation prevents $G$ from containing any cycles of odd length, so each of its finite subgraphs requires only two colors. However, in the Solovay model in which every set of real numbers is Lebesgue measurable, $G$ requires infinitely many colors, since in this case each color class must be a measurable set and it can be shown that every measurable set of real numbers with no edges in $G$ must have measure zero. Therefore, in the Solovay model, the (infinite) chromatic number of all of $G$ is much larger than the chromatic number of its finite subgraphs (at most two).

== Generalizations ==
Rado (1949) proves the following theorem, which may be seen as a generalization of the De Bruijn–Erdős theorem. Let $V$ be an infinite set, for instance the set of vertices in an infinite graph. For each element $v$ of $V$, let $c_v$ be a finite set of colors. Additionally, for every finite subset $S$ of $V$, choose some particular coloring $C_S$ of $S$, in which the color of each element $v$ of $S$ belongs to $c_v$. Then there exists a global coloring $\chi$ of all of $V$ with the property that every finite set $S$ has a finite superset $T$ on which $\chi$ and $C_T$ agree. In particular, if we choose a $k$-coloring for every finite subgraph of an infinite graph $G$, then there is a $k$-coloring of $G$ in which each finite graph has a larger supergraph whose coloring agrees with the coloring of the whole graph.

If a graph does not have finite chromatic number, then the De Bruijn–Erdős theorem implies that it must contain finite subgraphs of every possible finite chromatic number. Researchers have also investigated other conditions on the subgraphs that are forced to occur in this case. For instance, unboundedly chromatic graphs must also contain every possible finite bipartite graph as a subgraph. However, they may have arbitrarily large odd girth, and therefore they may avoid any finite set of non-bipartite subgraphs.

The De Bruijn–Erdős theorem also applies directly to hypergraph coloring problems, where one requires that each hyperedge have vertices of more than one color. As for graphs, a hypergraph has a $k$-coloring if and only if each of its finite sub-hypergraphs has a $k$-coloring. It is a special case of the compactness theorem of Kurt Gödel, stating that a set of first-order sentences has a model if and only if every finite subset of it has a model. More specifically, the De Bruijn–Erdős theorem can be interpreted as the compactness of the first-order structures whose non-logical values are any finite set of colors and whose only predicate on these values is inequality.

The theorem may also be generalized to situations in which the number of colors is an infinite cardinal number. If $\kappa$ is a strongly compact cardinal, then for every graph $G$ and cardinal number $\mu<\kappa$, $G$ has chromatic number at most $\mu$ if and only if each of its subgraphs of cardinality less than $\kappa$ has chromatic number at most $\mu$. The original De Bruijn–Erdős theorem is the case $\kappa=\aleph_0$ of this generalization, since a set is finite if and only if its cardinality is less than $\aleph_0$. However, some assumption such as the one of being a strongly compact cardinal is necessary: if the generalized continuum hypothesis is true, then for every infinite cardinal $\gamma$, there exists a graph $G$ of cardinality $(2^\gamma)^+$ such that the chromatic number of $G$ is greater than $\gamma$, but such that every subgraph of $G$ whose vertex set has smaller power than $G$ has chromatic number at most $\gamma$. Lake (1975) characterizes the infinite graphs that obey a generalization of the De Bruijn–Erdős theorem, in that their chromatic number is equal to the maximum chromatic number of their strictly smaller subgraphs.
