= Stephen Milne (mathematician) =

American mathematician

Stephen Carl Milne is an American mathematician who works in the fields of analysis, analytic number theory, and combinatorics.

== Education and career ==
Milne received a bachelor's degree from San Diego State University in 1972 and a Ph.D. from the University of California, San Diego (UCSD) in 1976. His thesis, Peano curves and smoothness of functions, was written under Adriano M. Garsia. From 1976 to 1978 he was a Gibbs Instructor at Yale University. Milne taught at Texas A&M University, UCSD, the University of Kentucky, and Ohio State University, where he became in 1982 an associate professor and in 1985 a full professor.

Milne works on algebraic combinatorics, classical analysis, special functions, analytic number theory, and Lie algebras (generalizations of the Macdonald identities).

=== Awards ===
From 1981 to 1983 he was a Sloan Fellow. In 2007 he was the joint recipient with Heiko Harborth of the Euler Medal. In 2012 Milne was elected a Fellow of the American Mathematical Society.

== Selected publications ==
- Milne, Stephen C. (1978). "A q-analog of restricted growth functions, Dobinski's equality, and Charlier polynomials". Transactions of the American Mathematical Society. 245: 89–118. doi:10.1090/s0002-9947-1978-0511401-8. MR 0511401.
- Milne, Stephen C.; Lilly, Glenn M. (1992). "The A_{ℓ} and C_{ℓ} Bailey transform and lemma". Bulletin of the American Mathematical Society. 26: 258–263. arXiv:math/9204236. doi:10.1090/s0273-0979-1992-00268-9. MR 1118702. S2CID 119144316.
- Milne, S. C. (1996). "New infinite families of exact sums of squares formulas, Jacobi elliptic functions, and Ramanujan's tau function". Proceedings of the National Academy of Sciences of the United States of America. 93 (26): 15004–15008. arXiv:math/0008068. Bibcode:1996PNAS...9315004M. doi:10.1073/pnas.93.26.15004. PMC 26345. PMID 11038532.
- Milne, Stephen C. (2002). Infinite families of exact sums of squares formulas, Jacobi elliptic functions, continued fractions, and Schur functions. Kluwer Academic Publishers. ISBN 9781402004919.
