= Integer lattice =

Lattice group in Euclidean space whose points are integer n-tuples

Approximations of regular pentagrams with vertices on a square lattice with coordinates indicated

Rational approximants of irrational values can be mapped to points lying close to lines having gradients corresponding to the values

In mathematics, the n-dimensional integer lattice, denoted $\mathbb{Z}^n$, is the lattice in the Euclidean space $\mathbb{R}^n$ whose lattice points are n-tuples of integers. The two-dimensional integer lattice is also called the square lattice (or grid lattice) and the three-dimensional integer lattice is called the cubic lattice. $\mathbb{Z}^n$ is the simplest example of a root lattice. The integer lattice is an odd unimodular lattice.

== Automorphism group ==
The automorphism group (or group of congruences) of the integer lattice consists of all permutations and sign changes of the coordinates, and is of order 2^{n} n!. As a matrix group it is given by the set of all n × n signed permutation matrices. This group is isomorphic to the semidirect product

$$(\mathbb Z_2)^n \rtimes S_n$$

where the symmetric group S_{n} acts on (Z_{2})^{n} by permutation (this is a classic example of a wreath product).

For the square lattice, this is the group of the square, or the dihedral group of order 8; for the three-dimensional cubic lattice, we get the group of the cube, or octahedral group, of order 48.

== Diophantine geometry ==
In the study of Diophantine geometry, the square lattice of points with integer coordinates is often referred to as the Diophantine plane. In mathematical terms, the Diophantine plane is the Cartesian product $\scriptstyle\mathbb{Z}\times\mathbb{Z}$ of the ring of all integers $\scriptstyle\mathbb{Z}$. The study of Diophantine figures focuses on the selection of nodes in the Diophantine plane such that all pairwise distances are integers.

== Coarse geometry ==
In coarse geometry, the integer lattice is coarsely equivalent to Euclidean space.

== Pick's theorem ==
i = 7, b = 8, A = i + b/2 − 1 = 10

Pick's theorem, first described by Georg Alexander Pick in 1899, provides a formula for the area of a simple polygon with all vertices lying on the 2-dimensional integer lattice, in terms of the number of integer points within it and on its boundary.

Let $i$ be the number of integer points interior to the polygon, and let $b$ be the number of integer points on its boundary (including both vertices and points along the sides). Then the area $A$ of this polygon is:
$$A = i + \frac{b}{2} - 1.$$
The example shown has $i=7$ interior points and $b=8$ boundary points, so its area is $A=7+\tfrac{8}{2}-1=10$ square units.

== See also ==
- Regular grid
