= Alexander Soifer =

Russian-born American mathematician

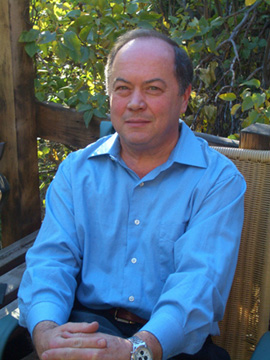
- Soifer in 2007, Colorado
- Born: Alexander Soifer; August 14, 1948 (age 78); Moscow, Russian SFSR
- Education: Moscow State Pedagogical University
- Scientific career
- Doctoral advisor: Leonid Kulikov; Paul Erdős

Alexander Soifer is a Russian-born American mathematician and mathematics author.

Soifer obtained his Ph.D. in 1973 and became a professor of mathematics at the University of Colorado in 1979. He was visiting fellow at Princeton University from 2002 to 2004, and again from 2006 to 2007. Soifer also teaches courses on art history and European cinema. His publications include 13 books and over 400 articles.

In 1991, Soifer established Geombinatorics, a quarterly scientific journal of mathematics, and also acts as its publisher with its editorial board through the University of Colorado Colorado Springs as of 2026. The journal covers problems in discrete, convex, and combinatorial geometry, as well as related areas. Geombinatorics is indexed in Zentralblatt MATH, Excellence in Research for Australia, and MathSciNet.

In July 2006 at the University of Cambridge, Soifer was presented with the Paul Erdős Award by the World Federation of National Mathematics Competitions.

Soifer was the President of the World Federation of National Mathematics Competitions from 2012 to 2018. His Erdős number is 1.

== Soifer Mathematical Olympiad ==
Every year, Soifer, along with other mathematician colleagues, sponsors the Soifer Mathematical Olympiad (formerly known as the Colorado Mathematical Olympiad (CMO)) at the University of Colorado Colorado Springs. Soifer founded the CMO on April 18, 1983, and compiles and writes most of the problems for the contest.

For the Olympiad's 30th anniversary, the university produced a film about it.

In May 2018, in recognition of 35 years of leadership, the judges and winners decided to rename the Colorado Mathematical Olympiad to the Soifer Mathematical Olympiad.

== Selected books ==
- The Scholar and the State: In Search of Van der Waerden Springer, New York, 2015 (publisher: Birkhauser-Springer, Basel)
- Mathematics as Problem Solving Center for Excellence in Mathematical Education, Colorado Springs, 1987
- How does one cut a triangle? Center for Excellence in Mathematical Education, Colorado Springs, 1990
- Colorado Mathematical Olympiad: The First Ten Years and Further Explorations Center for Excellence in Mathematical Education, Colorado Springs, 1991
- Geometric Etudes in Combinatorial Mathematics Center for Excellence in Mathematical Education, Colorado Springs, 1994
- The Mathematical Coloring Book Springer, New York 2009
- Mathematics as Problem Solving 2nd ed. Springer, New York 2009
- How Does One Cut a Triangle? 2nd ed. Springer, New York 2009
- The Colorado Mathematical Olympiad and Further Explorations: From the Mountains of Colorado to the Peaks of Mathematics Springer, New York 2011
- The Colorado Mathematical Olympiad; The Third Decade and Further Explorations: From the Mountains of Colorado to the Peaks of Mathematics Springer, New York 2017
- Geometric Etudes in Combinatorial Mathematics 2nd ed. Springer, New York 2010
- Ramsey Theory: Yesterday, Today, and Tomorrow, (editor and contributor) Birkhäuser-Springer 2011
- Life and Fate: In Search of Van der Waerden, appeared in November 2008 in Russian. The expanded English edition, The Scholar and the State: In Search of Van der Waerden, was published by Birkhäuser-Springer in 2017.
- The New Mathematical Coloring Book, Springer, New York, 2024. The new 2024 book doubles the volume of the original 2009 monograph.
