= Matchstick graph =

Graph with edges of length one, able to be drawn without crossings

Harborth graph
- Vertices: 52
- Edges: 104
- Radius: 6
- Diameter: 9
- Girth: 3

The unique smallest cubic matchstick graph

3-regular girth-5 matchstick graph
- Vertices: 54
- Edges: 81
- Girth: 5

In geometric graph theory, a branch of mathematics, a matchstick graph is a graph that can be drawn in the plane in such a way that its edges are line segments with length one that do not cross each other. That is, it is a graph that has an embedding which is simultaneously a unit distance graph and a plane graph. Informally, matchstick graphs can be made by placing noncrossing matchsticks on a flat surface, hence the name.

Matchstick graphs have also been called planar unit-distance graphs. However, to be a matchstick graph, the unit distance embedding must be plane; it is not enough for the graph to be planar. Some graphs have both non-crossing embeddings with non-unit vertex distances and unit-distance embeddings with crossings; these are planar unit-distance graphs but are not matchstick graphs. An example is the Dürer graph.

== Regular matchstick graphs ==
Much of the research on matchstick graphs has concerned regular graphs, in which each vertex has the same number of neighbors. This number is called the degree of the graph.

Regular matchstick graphs can have degree 0, 1, 2, 3, or 4. The complete graphs with one, two, and three vertices (a single vertex, a single edge, and a triangle) are all matchstick graphs and are 0-, 1-, and 2-regular respectively. The smallest 3-regular matchstick graph is formed from two copies of the diamond graph placed in such a way that corresponding vertices are at unit distance from each other; its bipartite double cover is the 8-crossed prism graph.

In 1986, Heiko Harborth presented the graph that became known as the Harborth Graph. It has 104 edges and 52 vertices and is currently the smallest known example of a 4-regular matchstick graph. It is a rigid graph.

Every 4-regular matchstick graph contains at least 20 vertices. Examples of 4-regular matchstick graphs are currently known for all number of vertices ≥ 52 except for 53, 55, 56, 58, 59, 61 and 62. The graphs with 54, 57, 65, 67, 73, 74, 77 and 85 vertices were first published in 2016. For 52, 54, 57, 60 and 64 vertices only one example is known. Of these five graphs only the one with 60 vertices is flexible, the other four are rigid.

It is not possible for a regular matchstick graph to have degree greater than four. More strongly, every $n$-vertex matchstick graph has $\Omega(\sqrt n)$ vertices of degree four or less. The smallest 3-regular matchstick graph without triangles (girth ≥ 4) has 20 vertices, as proved by Kurz and Mazzuoccolo. The smallest known example of a 3-regular matchstick graph of girth 5 has 54 vertices and was first presented by Mike Winkler in 2019.

The maximum number of edges a matchstick graph on $n$ vertices can have is $\left\lfloor 3n - \sqrt{12n-3}\right\rfloor$.

== Computational complexity ==
It is NP-hard to test whether a given undirected planar graph can be realized as a matchstick graph. More precisely, this problem is complete for the existential theory of the reals. Kurz (2011) provides some easily tested necessary criteria for a graph to be a matchstick graph, but these are not also sufficient criteria: a graph may pass Kurz's tests and still not be a matchstick graph.

It is also NP-complete to determine whether a matchstick graph has a Hamiltonian cycle, even when the vertices of the graph all have integer coordinates that are given as part of the input to the problem, because this is already true of grid graphs.

== Combinatorial enumeration ==
The numbers of distinct (nonisomorphic) matchstick graphs are known for 1, 2, 3, ... up to thirteen edges; they are:

1, 1, 3, 5, 12, 28, 74, 207, 633, 2008, 6774, 23868, 87667 (sequence A066951 in the OEIS)

For instance the three different graphs that can be made with three matchsticks are a claw, a triangle graph, and a three-edge path graph.

== Special classes of graphs ==
Uniformity of edge lengths has long been seen as a desirable quality in graph drawing, and some specific classes of planar graphs can always be drawn with completely uniform edges.

Every tree can be drawn in such a way that, if the leaf edges of the tree were replaced by infinite rays, the drawing would partition the plane into convex polygonal regions, without any crossings. For such a drawing, if the lengths of each edge are changed arbitrarily, without changing the slope of the edge, the drawing will remain planar. In particular, it is possible to choose all edges to have equal length, resulting in a realization of an arbitrary tree as a matchstick graph.

Realization of a squaregraph as a matchstick graph

A similar property is true for squaregraphs, the planar graphs that can be drawn in the plane in such a way that every bounded face is a quadrilateral and every vertex either lies on the unbounded face or has at least four neighbors. These graphs can be drawn with all faces parallelograms, in such a way that if a subset of edges that are all parallel to each other are lengthened or shortened simultaneously so that they continue to all have the same length, then no crossing can be introduced. This makes it possible to normalize the edges so that they all have the same length, and obtain a realization of any squaregraph as a matchstick graph.

== Related classes of graphs ==
Every matchstick graph is a unit distance graph. Penny graphs are the graphs that can be represented by tangencies of non-overlapping unit circles. Every penny graph is a matchstick graph. However, some matchstick graphs (such as the eight-vertex cubic matchstick graph of the first illustration) are not penny graphs, because realizing them as a matchstick graph causes some non-adjacent vertices to be closer than unit distance to each other.
