= Herschel graph =

Bipartite non-Hamiltonian polyhedral graph

- The Herschel graph
- Named after: Alexander Stewart Herschel
- Vertices: 11
- Edges: 18
- Automorphisms: 12 (D_{6})
- Properties: Polyhedral; Bipartite; non-Hamiltonian

In graph theory, a branch of mathematics, the Herschel graph is a bipartite undirected graph with 11 vertices and 18 edges. It is a polyhedral graph (the graph of a convex polyhedron), and is the smallest polyhedral graph that does not have a Hamiltonian cycle, a cycle passing through all its vertices. The polyhedron whose vertices and edges form this graph is sometimes called the Herschel enneahedron; it is an enneahedron because it has nine faces.

Both the graph and the polyhedron are named after British astronomer Alexander Stewart Herschel, because of Herschel's studies of Hamiltonian cycles in polyhedral graphs (but not of this graph).

== Definition and properties ==
The Herschel graph has three vertices of degree four (the three blue vertices aligned vertically in the center of the illustration) and eight vertices of degree three. Each two distinct degree-four vertices share two degree-three neighbors, forming a four-vertex cycle with these shared neighbors. There are three of these cycles, passing through six of the eight degree-three vertices (red in the illustration). Two more degree-three vertices (blue) do not participate in these four-vertex cycles; instead, each is adjacent to three of the six red vertices.

The Herschel graph is a polyhedral graph; this means that it is a planar graph, one that can be drawn in the plane with none of its edges crossing, and that it is 3-vertex-connected: the removal of any two of its vertices leaves a connected subgraph. It is a bipartite graph: when it is colored with five blue and six red vertices, as illustrated, each edge has one red endpoint and one blue endpoint.

It has order-6 dihedral symmetry, for a total of 12 members of its automorphism group. The degree-four vertices can be permuted arbitrarily, giving six permutations, and in addition, for each permutation of the degree-four vertices, there is a symmetry that keeps these vertices fixed and exchanges pairs of degree-three vertices.

== Polyhedron ==
The Herschel graph as a polyhedron

The dual polyhedron, a rectified triangular prism

By Steinitz's theorem, every graph that is planar and 3-vertex-connected is the skeleton of some convex polyhedron. Because the Herschel graph has these properties, it can be represented in this way by a convex enneahedron, a polyhedron whose faces are nine quadrilaterals. This can be designed so that each graph automorphism corresponds to a symmetry of the polyhedron, in which case three of the faces will be rhombi or squares, and the other six will be kites.

The dual polyhedron is a rectified triangular prism, which can be formed as the convex hull of the midpoints of the edges of a triangular prism. When constructed in this way, it has three square faces on the same planes as the square faces of the prism, two equilateral triangle faces on the planes of the triangular ends of the prism, and six more isosceles triangle faces. This polyhedron has the property that its faces cannot be numbered in such a way that consecutive numbers appear on adjacent faces, and such that the first and last numbers are also on adjacent faces, because such a numbering would necessarily correspond to a Hamiltonian cycle in the Herschel graph. Polyhedral face numberings of this type are used as "spindown life counters" in the game Magic: The Gathering, to track player lives, by turning the polyhedron to an adjacent face whenever a life is lost. A card in the game, the Lich, allows players to return from a nearly-lost state with a single life to their initial number of lives. Because the dual polyhedron for the Herschel graph cannot be numbered in such a way that this step connects adjacent faces, Constantinides & Constantinides (2018) name the canonical polyhedron realization of this dual polyhedron as "the Lich's nemesis".

== Hamiltonicity ==
A Hamiltonian path (but not cycle) in the Herschel graph

As a bipartite graph that has an odd number of vertices, the Herschel graph does not contain a Hamiltonian cycle (a cycle of edges that passes through each vertex exactly once). For, in any bipartite graph, any cycle must alternate between the vertices on either side of the bipartition, and therefore must contain equal numbers of both types of vertex and must have an even length. Thus, a cycle passing once through each of the eleven vertices cannot exist in the Herschel graph. A graph is called Hamiltonian whenever it contains a Hamiltonian cycle, so the Herschel graph is not Hamiltonian. It has the smallest number of vertices, the smallest number of edges, and the smallest number of faces of any non-Hamiltonian polyhedral graph. There exist other polyhedral graphs with 11 vertices and no Hamiltonian cycles (notably the Goldner–Harary graph) but none with fewer edges.

All but three of the vertices of the Herschel graph have degree three. A graph is called cubic or 3-regular when all of its vertices have degree three. P. G. Tait conjectured that a polyhedral 3-regular graph must be Hamiltonian; this was disproved when W. T. Tutte provided a counterexample, the Tutte graph, which is much larger than the Herschel graph. A refinement of Tait's conjecture, Barnette's conjecture that every bipartite 3-regular polyhedral graph is Hamiltonian, remains open.

Every maximal planar graph that does not have a Hamiltonian cycle has a Herschel graph as a minor. The Herschel graph is conjectured to be one of three minor-minimal non-Hamiltonian 3-vertex-connected graphs. The other two are the complete bipartite graph $K_{3,4}$ and a graph formed by splitting both the Herschel graph and $K_{3,4}$ into two symmetric halves by three-vertex separators and then combining one half from each graph.

The medial graph of the Herschel graph is a 4-regular planar graph with no Hamiltonian decomposition. The shaded regions correspond to the vertices of the underlying Herschel graph.

The Herschel graph also provides an example of a polyhedral graph for which the medial graph has no Hamiltonian decomposition into two edge-disjoint Hamiltonian cycles. The medial graph of the Herschel graph is a 4-regular graph with 18 vertices, one for each edge of the Herschel graph; two vertices are adjacent in the medial graph whenever the corresponding edges of the Herschel graph are consecutive on one of its faces. It is 4-vertex-connected and essentially 6-edge-connected. Here, a graph is $k$-vertex-connected or $k$-edge-connected if the removal of fewer than $k$ vertices or edges (respectively) cannot disconnect it. Planar graphs cannot be 6-edge-connected, because they always have a vertex of degree at most five, and removing the neighboring edges disconnects the graph. The "essentially 6-edge-connected" terminology means that this trivial way of disconnecting the graph is ignored, and it is impossible to disconnect the graph into two subgraphs that each have at least two vertices by removing five or fewer edges.

== History ==
The Herschel graph is named after Alexander Stewart Herschel, a British astronomer, who wrote an early paper concerning William Rowan Hamilton's icosian game. This is a puzzle involving finding Hamiltonian cycles on a polyhedron, usually the regular dodecahedron. The Herschel graph describes the smallest convex polyhedron that can be used in place of the dodecahedron to give a game that has no solution. Herschel's paper described solutions for the Icosian game only on the graphs of the regular tetrahedron and regular icosahedron; it did not describe the Herschel graph. The name "the Herschel graph" makes an early appearance in a graph theory textbook by John Adrian Bondy and U. S. R. Murty, published in 1976. The graph itself was described earlier, for instance by H. S. M. Coxeter.
