= Enneahedron =

Polyhedron with 9 faces

In geometry, an enneahedron (or nonahedron) is a polyhedron with nine faces. There are 2606 types of convex enneahedra, each having a different pattern of vertex, edge, and face connections. None of them are regular.

== Examples ==
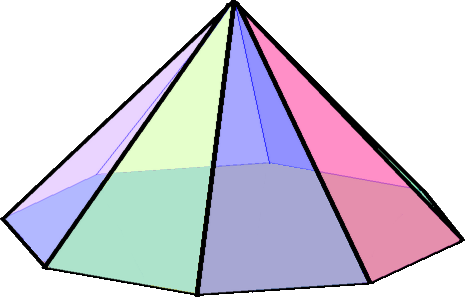
Octagonal pyramid: a pyramid with eight isosceles triangular faces around a regular octagonal base.

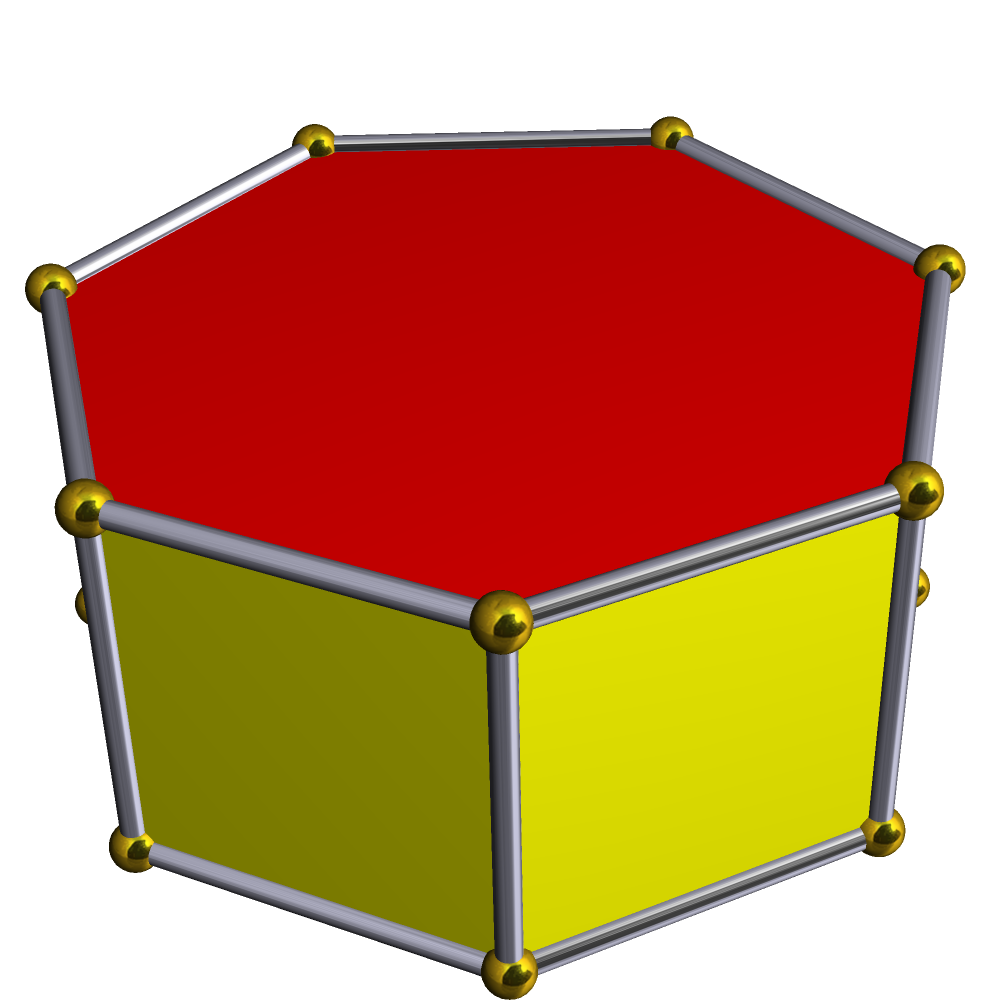
Heptagonal prism: a prismatic uniform polyhedron with two regular heptagon faces and seven square faces.

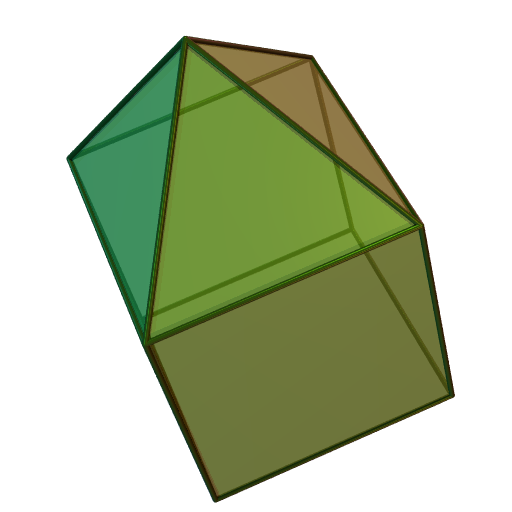
Elongated square pyramid: a Johnson solid with four equilateral triangles and five squares. It is obtained by attaching an equilateral square pyramid to the face of a cube.

Elongated triangular bipyramid: a Johnson solid with six equilateral triangles and three squares. Obtained by attaching two regular tetrahedra onto the face of a triangular prism's bases.

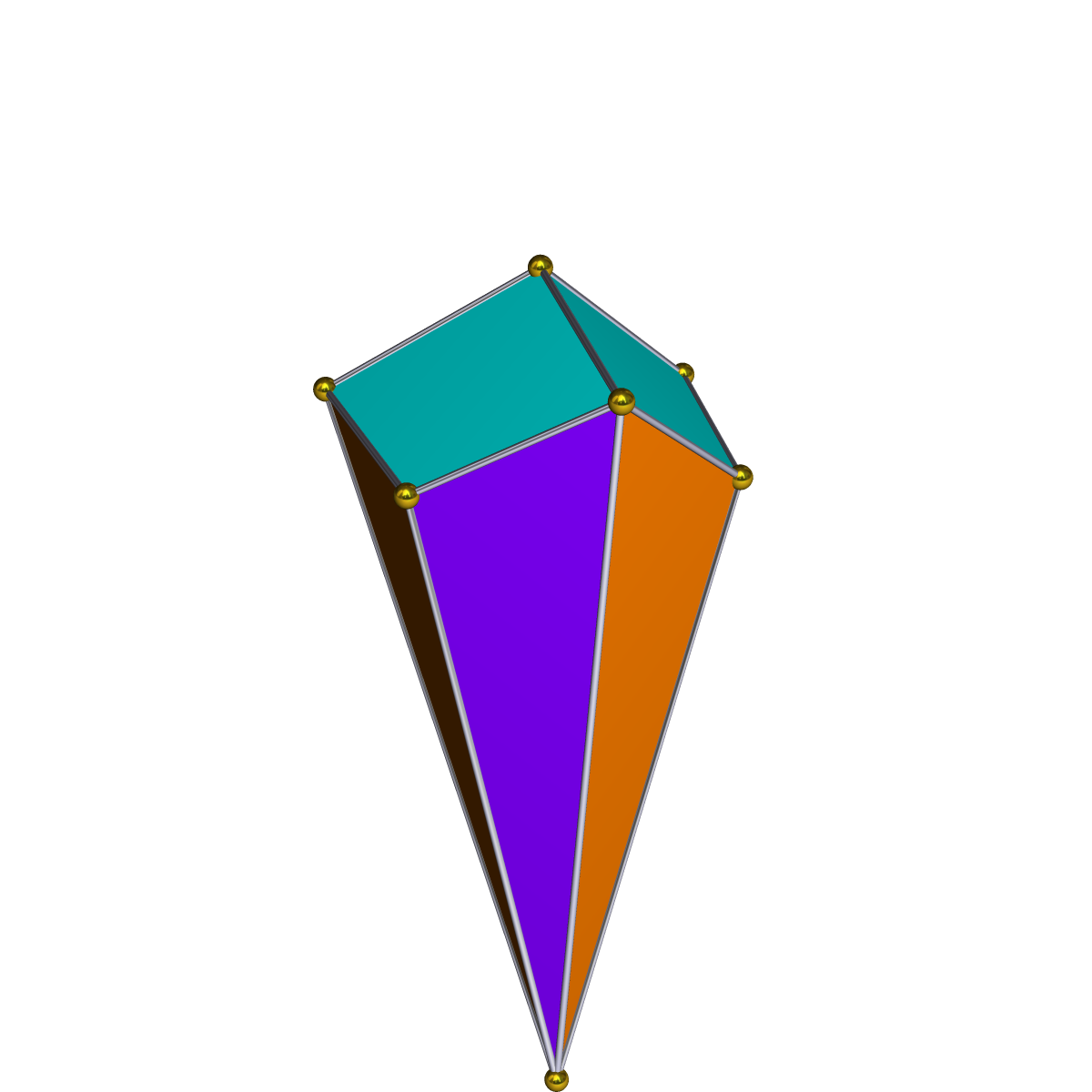
Dual of triangular cupola

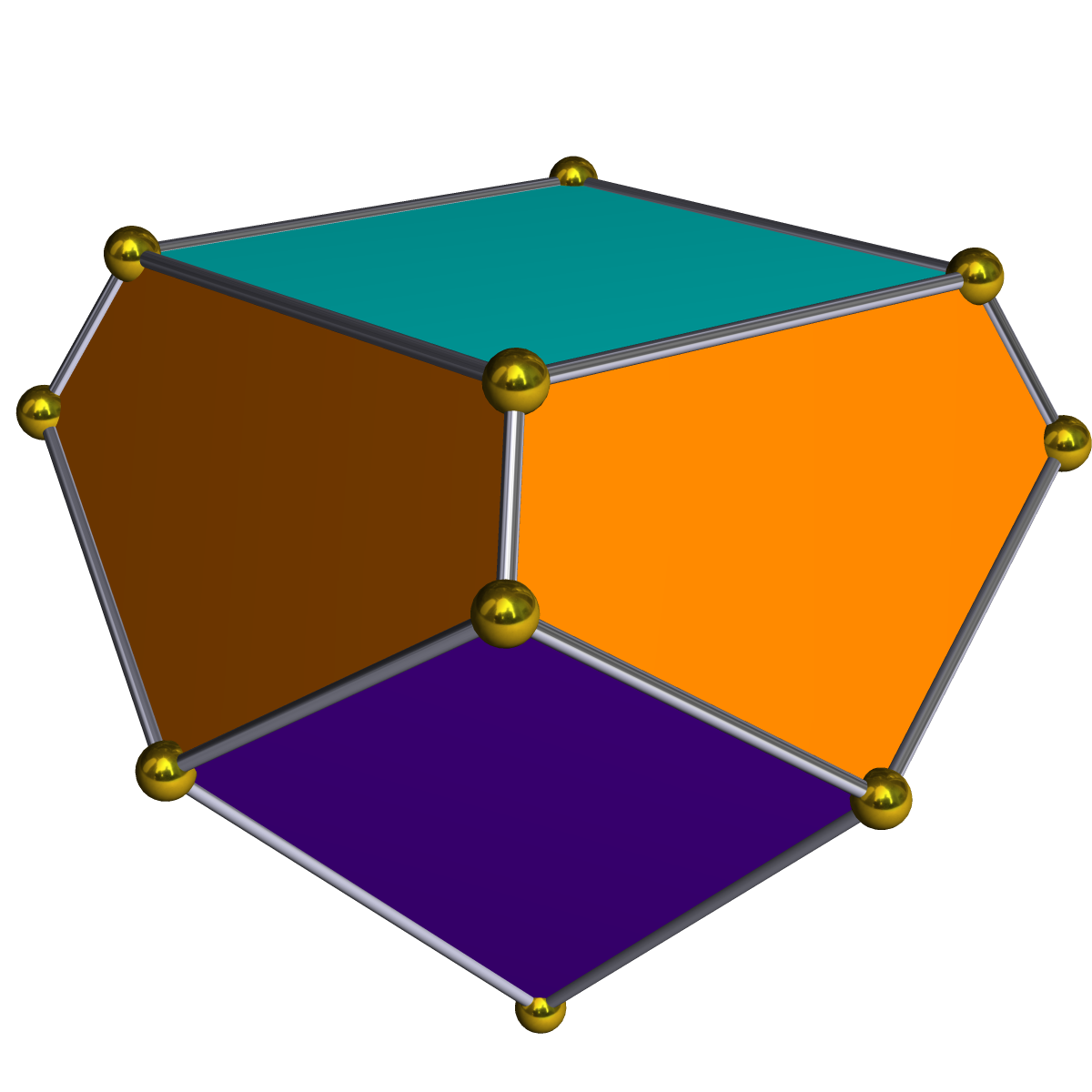
Dual of gyroelongated square pyramid

The vertex figure of a dual snub 24-cell with six isosceles triangles and three kites as its faces.

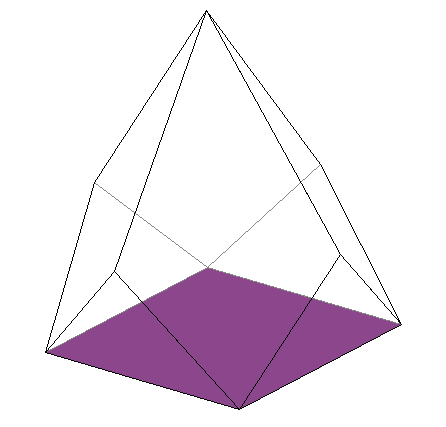
Square diminished trapezohedron

The dual of a triaugmented triangular prism, realized with three non-adjacent squares and six irregular pentagonal faces. It is an order-5 associahedron $K_5$, a polyhedron whose vertices represent the 14 triangulations of a regular hexagon.

The Herschel enneahedron. All of the faces are quadrilaterals. It is the simplest polyhedron without a Hamiltonian cycle, the only convex enneahedron in which all faces have the same number of edges, and one of only three bipartite convex enneahedra.

The two smallest possible isospectral polyhedral graphs, enneahedra with eight vertices each.

== Space-filling enneahedra ==
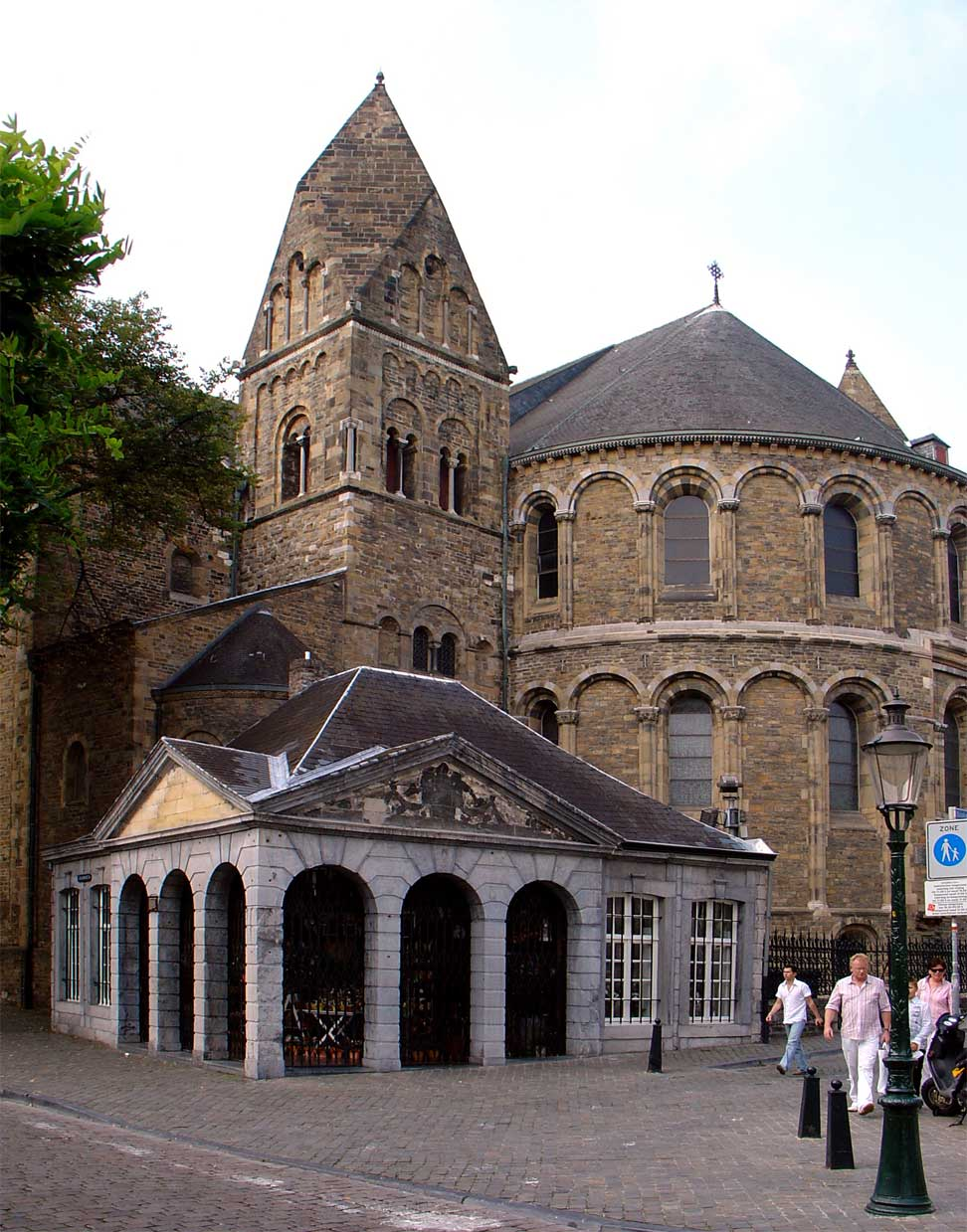
The Basilica of Our Lady (Maastricht), whose enneahedral tower tops form a space-filling polyhedron.

Slicing a rhombic dodecahedron in half through the long diagonals of four of its faces results in a self-dual enneahedron, the square diminished trapezohedron, with one large square face, four rhombus faces, and four isosceles triangle faces. Like the rhombic dodecahedron itself, this shape can be used to tessellate three-dimensional space. An elongated form of this shape that still tiles space can be seen atop the rear side towers of the 12th-century Romanesque Basilica of Our Lady (Maastricht). The towers themselves, with their four pentagonal sides, four roof facets, and square base, form another space-filling enneahedron.

More generally, Goldberg (1982) found at least 40 topologically distinct space-filling enneahedra.

== Topologically distinct enneahedra ==
There are 2606 topologically distinct convex enneahedra, excluding mirror images. These can be divided into subsets of 8, 74, 296, 633, 768, 558, 219, 50, with 7 to 14 vertices, respectively. A table of these numbers, together with a detailed description of the nine-vertex enneahedra, was first published in the 1870s by Thomas Kirkman.
