= Kleetope =

Polytope made by turning a polytope's facets into pyramids

In geometry and polyhedral combinatorics, the Kleetope of a polyhedron or higher-dimensional convex polytope P is another polyhedron or polytope P^{K} formed by replacing each facet of P with a pyramid. In some cases, the pyramid is chosen to have regular sides, often producing a non-convex polytope; alternatively, by using sufficiently shallow pyramids, the results may remain convex. Kleetopes are named after Victor Klee, although the same concept was known under other names long before the work of Klee.

== Examples ==
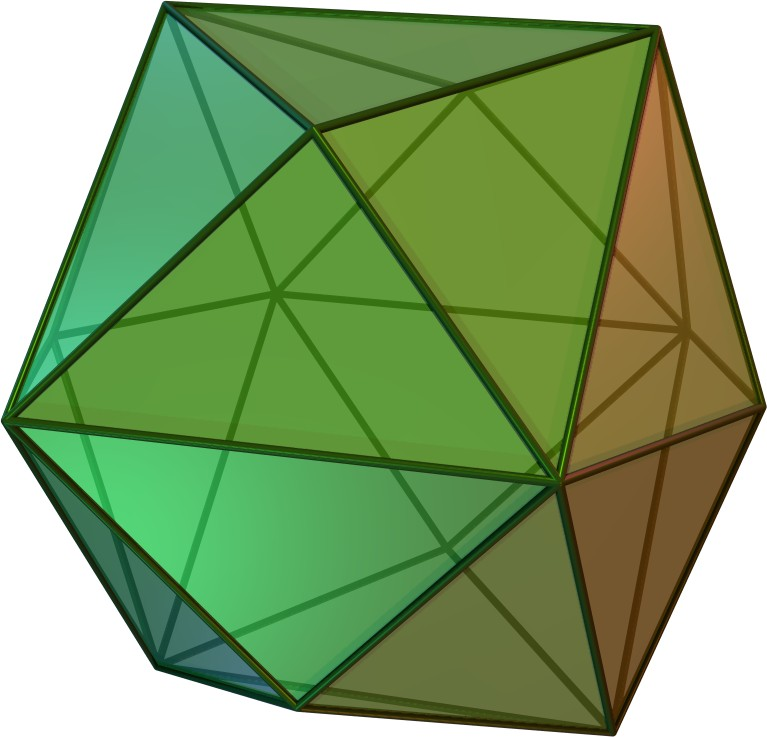
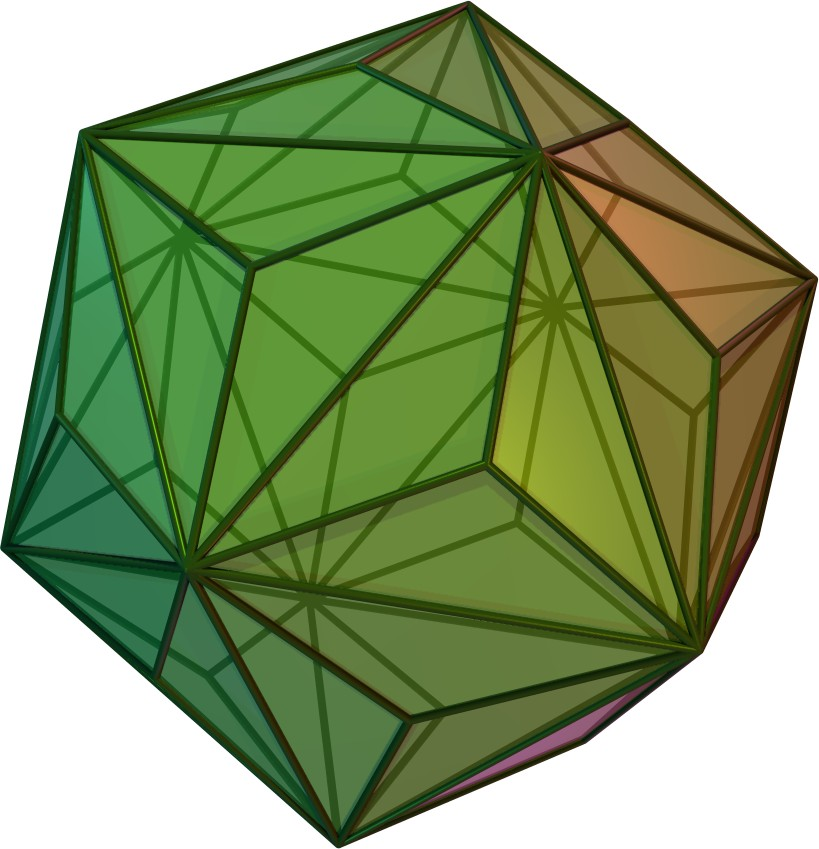
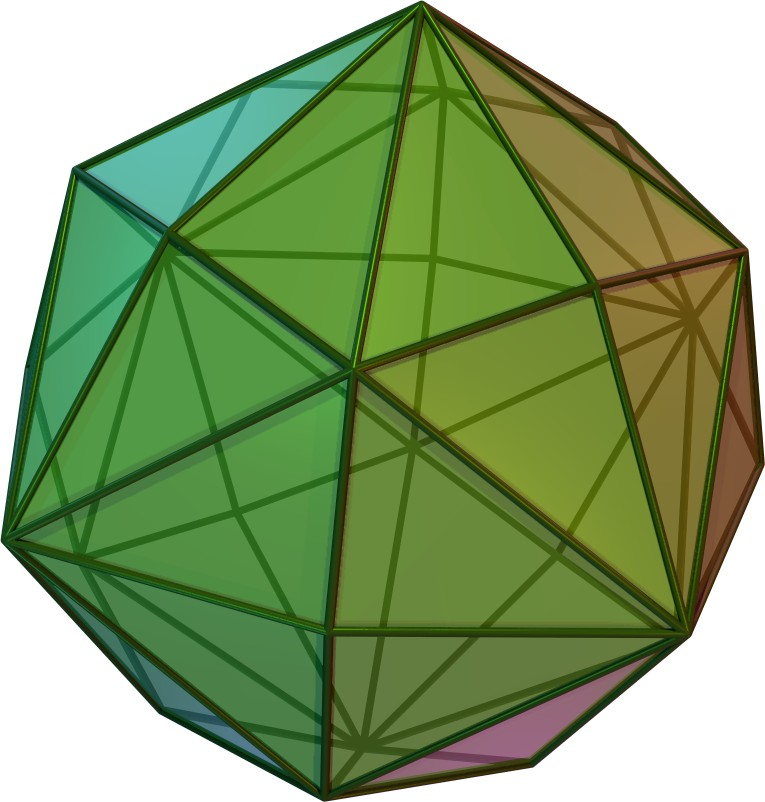
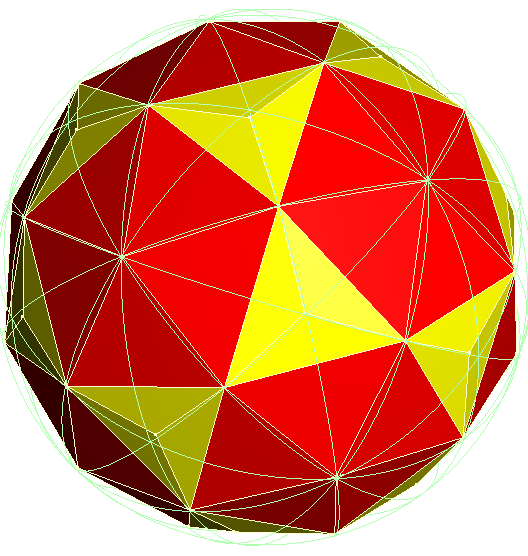
Some examples of Kleetope: tetrakis hexahedron, triakis icosahedron, disdyakis dodecahedron, and tripentakis icosidodecahedron.

In each of these cases, the Kleetope is formed by attaching pyramids onto each face of the original polyhedron. These examples can be seen from the Platonic solids:

- The triakis tetrahedron is the Kleetope of a tetrahedron, the triakis octahedron is the Kleetope of an octahedron, and the triakis icosahedron is the Kleetope of an icosahedron. These Kleetopes are formed by adding a triangular pyramid to each face of them.
- The tetrakis hexahedron is the Kleetope of the cube, formed by adding a square pyramid to each of its faces
- The pentakis dodecahedron is the Kleetope of the dodecahedron, formed by adding a pentagonal pyramid to each face of the dodecahedron.

The base polyhedron of a Kleetope does not need to be a Platonic solid. For instance, the disdyakis dodecahedron is the Kleetope of the rhombic dodecahedron, formed by replacing each rhombus face of the dodecahedron with a rhombic pyramid, and the disdyakis triacontahedron is the Kleetope of the rhombic triacontahedron. In fact, the base polyhedron of a Kleetope does not need to be face-transitive, as can be seen from the tripentakis icosidodecahedron above.

== Definitions ==
One method of forming the Kleetope of a polytope P is to place a new vertex outside P, near the centroid of each facet. If all of these new vertices are placed close enough to the corresponding centroids, then the only other vertices visible to them will be the vertices of the facets from which they are defined. In this case, the Kleetope of P is the convex hull of the union of the vertices of P and the set of new vertices.

Alternatively, the Kleetope may be defined by duality and its dual operation, truncation: the Kleetope of P is the dual polyhedron of the truncation of the dual of P.

== Properties and applications ==
If P has enough vertices relative to its dimension, then the Kleetope of P is dimensionally unambiguous: the graph formed by its edges and vertices is not the graph of a different polyhedron or polytope with a different dimension. More specifically, if the number of vertices of a d-dimensional polytope P is at least d^{2}/2, then P^{K} is dimensionally unambiguous.

If every i-dimensional face of a d-dimensional polytope P is a simplex, and if i ≤ d − 2, then every (i + 1)-dimensional face of P^{K} is also a simplex. In particular, the Kleetope of any three-dimensional polyhedron is a simplicial polyhedron, a polyhedron in which all facets are triangles.

The Kleetope of a triangular bipyramid

Kleetopes may be used to generate polyhedra that do not have any Hamiltonian cycles: any path through one of the vertices added in the Kleetope construction must go into and out of the vertex through its neighbors in the original polyhedron, and if there are more new vertices than original vertices then there are not enough neighbors to go around. In particular, the Goldner–Harary graph, the Kleetope of the triangular bipyramid, has six vertices added in the Kleetope construction and only five in the bipyramid from which it was formed, so it is non-Hamiltonian; it is the simplest possible non-Hamiltonian simplicial polyhedron. If a polyhedron with n vertices is formed by repeating the Kleetope construction some number of times, starting from a tetrahedron, then its longest path has length O(n^{log_{3} 2}); that is, the shortness exponent of these graphs is log_{3} 2, approximately 0.630930. The same technique shows that in any higher dimension d, there exist simplicial polytopes with shortness exponent log_{d} 2. Similarly, Plummer (1992) used the Kleetope construction to provide an infinite family of examples of simplicial polyhedra with an even number of vertices that have no perfect matching.

Kleetopes also have some extreme properties related to their vertex degrees: if each edge in a planar graph is incident to at least seven other edges, then there must exist a vertex of degree at most five all but one of whose neighbors have degree 20 or more, and the Kleetope of the Kleetope of the icosahedron provides an example in which the high-degree vertices have degree exactly 20.
