= Ore's theorem =

On degree sums and Hamiltonian cycles

A graph meeting the conditions of Ore's theorem, and a Hamiltonian cycle in it. There are two vertices with degree less than n/2 in the center of the drawing, so the conditions for Dirac's theorem are not met. However, these two vertices are adjacent, and all other pairs of vertices have total degree at least seven, the number of vertices.

Ore's theorem is a result in graph theory proved in 1960 by Norwegian mathematician Øystein Ore. It gives a sufficient condition for a graph to be Hamiltonian, essentially stating that a graph with sufficiently many edges must contain a Hamilton cycle. Specifically, the theorem considers the sum of the degrees of pairs of non-adjacent vertices: if every such pair has a sum that at least equals the total number of vertices in the graph, then the graph is Hamiltonian.

== Formal statement ==
Let G be a (finite and simple) graph with n ≥ 3 vertices. We denote by deg v the degree of a vertex v in G, i.e. the number of incident edges in G to v. Then, Ore's theorem states that if

deg v + deg w ≥ n for every pair of distinct non-adjacent vertices v and w of G	∗

then G is Hamiltonian.

== Proof ==
Illustration for the proof of Ore's theorem. In a graph with the Hamiltonian path v_{1}...v_{n} but no Hamiltonian cycle, at most one of the two edges v_{1}v_{i} and v_{i − 1}v_{n} (shown as blue dashed curves) can exist. For, if they both exist, then adding them to the path and removing the (red) edge v_{i − 1}v_{i} would produce a Hamiltonian cycle.

It is equivalent to show that every non-Hamiltonian graph G does not obey condition (∗). Accordingly, let G be a graph on n ≥ 3 vertices that is not Hamiltonian, and let H be formed from G by adding edges one at a time that do not create a Hamiltonian cycle, until no more edges can be added. Let x and y be any two non-adjacent vertices in H. Then adding edge xy to H would create at least one new Hamiltonian cycle, and the edges other than xy in such a cycle must form a Hamiltonian path v_{1}v_{2}...v_{n} in H with x = v_{1} and y = v_{n}. For each index i in the range 2 ≤ i ≤ n, consider the two possible edges in H from v_{1} to v_{i} and from v_{i − 1} to v_{n}. At most one of these two edges can be present in H, for otherwise the cycle v_{1}v_{2}...v_{i − 1}v_{n}v_{n − 1}...v_{i}v_{1} would be a Hamiltonian cycle. Thus, the total number of edges incident to either v_{1} or v_{n} is at most equal to the number of choices of i, which is n − 1. Therefore, H does not obey property (∗), which requires that this total number of edges (deg v_{1} + deg v_{n}) be greater than or equal to n. Since the vertex degrees in G are at most equal to the degrees in H, it follows that G also does not obey property (∗).

== Algorithm ==
Palmer (1997) describes the following simple algorithm for constructing a Hamiltonian cycle in a graph meeting Ore's condition.

1. Arrange the vertices arbitrarily into a cycle, ignoring adjacencies in the graph.
2. While the cycle contains two consecutive vertices v_{i} and v_{i + 1} that are not adjacent in the graph, perform the following two steps:
  - Search for an index j such that the four vertices v_{i}, v_{i + 1}, v_{j}, and v_{j + 1} are all distinct and such that the graph contains edges from v_{i} to v_{j} and from v_{j + 1} to v_{i + 1}
  - Reverse the part of the cycle between v_{i + 1} and v_{j} (inclusive).

Each step increases the number of consecutive pairs in the cycle that are adjacent in the graph, by one or two pairs (depending on whether v_{j} and v_{j + 1} are already adjacent), so the outer loop can only happen at most n times before the algorithm terminates, where n is the number of vertices in the given graph. By an argument similar to the one in the proof of the theorem, the desired index j must exist, or else the nonadjacent vertices v_{i} and v_{i + 1} would have too small a total degree. Finding i and j, and reversing part of the cycle, can all be accomplished in time O(n). Therefore, the total time for the algorithm is O(n^{2}), matching the number of edges in the input graph.

== Related results ==
Ore's theorem is a generalization of Dirac's theorem that, when each vertex has degree at least n/2, the graph is Hamiltonian. For, if a graph meets Dirac's condition, then clearly each pair of vertices has degrees adding to at least n.

In turn Ore's theorem is generalized by the Bondy–Chvátal theorem. One may define a closure operation on a graph in which, whenever two nonadjacent vertices have degrees adding to at least n, one adds an edge connecting them; if a graph meets the conditions of Ore's theorem, its closure is a complete graph. The Bondy–Chvátal theorem states that a graph is Hamiltonian if and only if its closure is Hamiltonian; since the complete graph is Hamiltonian, Ore's theorem is an immediate consequence.

Woodall (1972) found a version of Ore's theorem that applies to directed graphs. Suppose a digraph G has the property that, for every two vertices u and v, either there is an edge from u to v or the outdegree of u plus the indegree of v equals or exceeds the number of vertices in G. Then, according to Woodall's theorem, G contains a directed Hamiltonian cycle. Ore's theorem may be obtained from Woodall by replacing every edge in a given undirected graph by a pair of directed edges. A closely related theorem by Meyniel (1973) states that an n-vertex strongly connected digraph with the property that, for every two nonadjacent vertices u and v, the total number of edges incident to u or v is at least 2n − 1 must be Hamiltonian.

Ore's theorem may also be strengthened to give a stronger conclusion than Hamiltonicity as a consequence of the degree condition in the theorem. Specifically, every graph satisfying the conditions of Ore's theorem is either a regular complete bipartite graph or is pancyclic (Bondy 1971).
