= Strength of a graph =

Graph-theoretic connectivity parameter

Strength of a graph: example
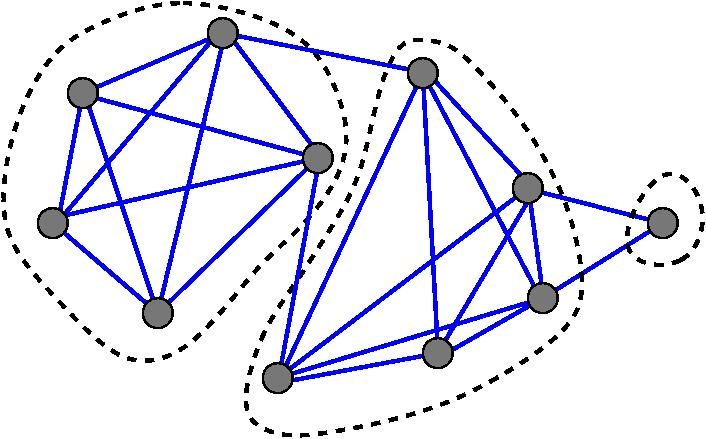
- A graph with strength 2: the graph is here decomposed into three parts, with 4 edges between the parts, giving a ratio of 4/(3-1)=2.

In graph theory, the strength of an undirected graph corresponds to the minimum ratio of edges removed/components created in a decomposition of the graph in question. It is a method to compute partitions of the set of vertices and detect zones of high concentration of edges, and is analogous to graph toughness which is defined similarly for vertex removal.

== Definitions ==
The strength $\sigma(G)$ of an undirected simple graph G = (V, E) admits the three following definitions:

- Let $\Pi$ be the set of all partitions of $V$, and $\partial \pi$ be the set of edges crossing over the sets of the partition $\pi\in\Pi$, then $\displaystyle\sigma(G)=\min_{\pi\in\Pi}\frac{|\partial \pi|}{|\pi|-1}$.
- Also if $\mathcal T$ is the set of all spanning trees of G, then

$$\sigma(G)=\max\left\{\sum_{T\in\mathcal T}\lambda_T\ :\ \forall T\in {\mathcal T}\ \lambda_T\geq 0\mbox{ and }\forall e\in E\ \sum_{T\ni e}\lambda_T\leq1\right\}.$$

- And by linear programming duality,

$$\sigma(G)=\min\left\{\sum_{e\in E}y_e\ :\ \forall e\in E\ y_e\geq0\mbox{ and }\forall T\in {\mathcal T}\ \sum_{e\in E}y_e\geq1\right\}.$$

== Complexity ==
Computing the strength of a graph can be done in polynomial time, and the first such algorithm was discovered by Cunningham (1985). The algorithm with best complexity for computing exactly the strength is due to Trubin (1993), uses the flow decomposition of Goldberg and Rao (1998), in time $O(\min(\sqrt{m},n^ {2/3})mn\log(n^2/m+2))$.

== Properties ==
- If $\pi=\{V_1,\dots,V_k\}$ is one partition that maximizes, and for $i\in\{1,\dots,k\}$, $G_i=G/V_i$ is the restriction of G to the set $V_i$, then $\sigma(G_k)\geq\sigma(G)$.
- The Tutte-Nash-Williams theorem: $\lfloor\sigma(G)\rfloor$ is the maximum number of edge-disjoint spanning trees that can be contained in G.
- Contrary to the graph partition problem, the partitions output by computing the strength are not necessarily balanced (i.e. of almost equal size).
