= Shortness exponent =

In graph theory, the shortness exponent is a numerical parameter of a family of graphs that measures how far from Hamiltonian the graphs in the family can be. Intuitively, if $e$ is the shortness exponent of a graph family ${\mathcal F}$, then every $n$-vertex graph in the family has a cycle of length near $n^e$ but some graphs do not have longer cycles. More precisely, for any ordering of the graphs in ${\mathcal F}$ into a sequence $G_0, G_1, \dots$, with $h(G)$ defined to be the length of the longest cycle in graph $G$, the shortness exponent is defined as

$$\liminf_{i\to\infty} \frac{\log h(G_i)}{\log |V(G_i)|}.$$

This number is always in the interval from 0 to 1; it is 1 for families of graphs that always contain a Hamiltonian or near-Hamiltonian cycle, and 0 for families of graphs in which the longest cycle length can be smaller than any constant power of the number of vertices.

The shortness exponent of the polyhedral graphs is $\log_3 2\approx 0.631$. A construction based on kleetopes shows that some polyhedral graphs have longest cycle length $O(n^{\log_3 2})$, while it has also been proven that every polyhedral graph contains a cycle of length $\Omega(n^{\log_3 2})$. The polyhedral graphs are the graphs that are simultaneously planar and 3-vertex-connected; the assumption of 3-vertex-connectivity is necessary for these results, as there exist sets of 2-vertex-connected planar graphs (such as the complete bipartite graphs $K_{2,n}$) with shortness exponent 0. There are many additional known results on shortness exponents of restricted subclasses of planar and polyhedral graphs.

The 3-vertex-connected cubic graphs (without the restriction that they be planar) also have a shortness exponent that has been proven to lie strictly between 0 and 1.
