= Tetrakis hexahedron =

Catalan solid with 24 faces

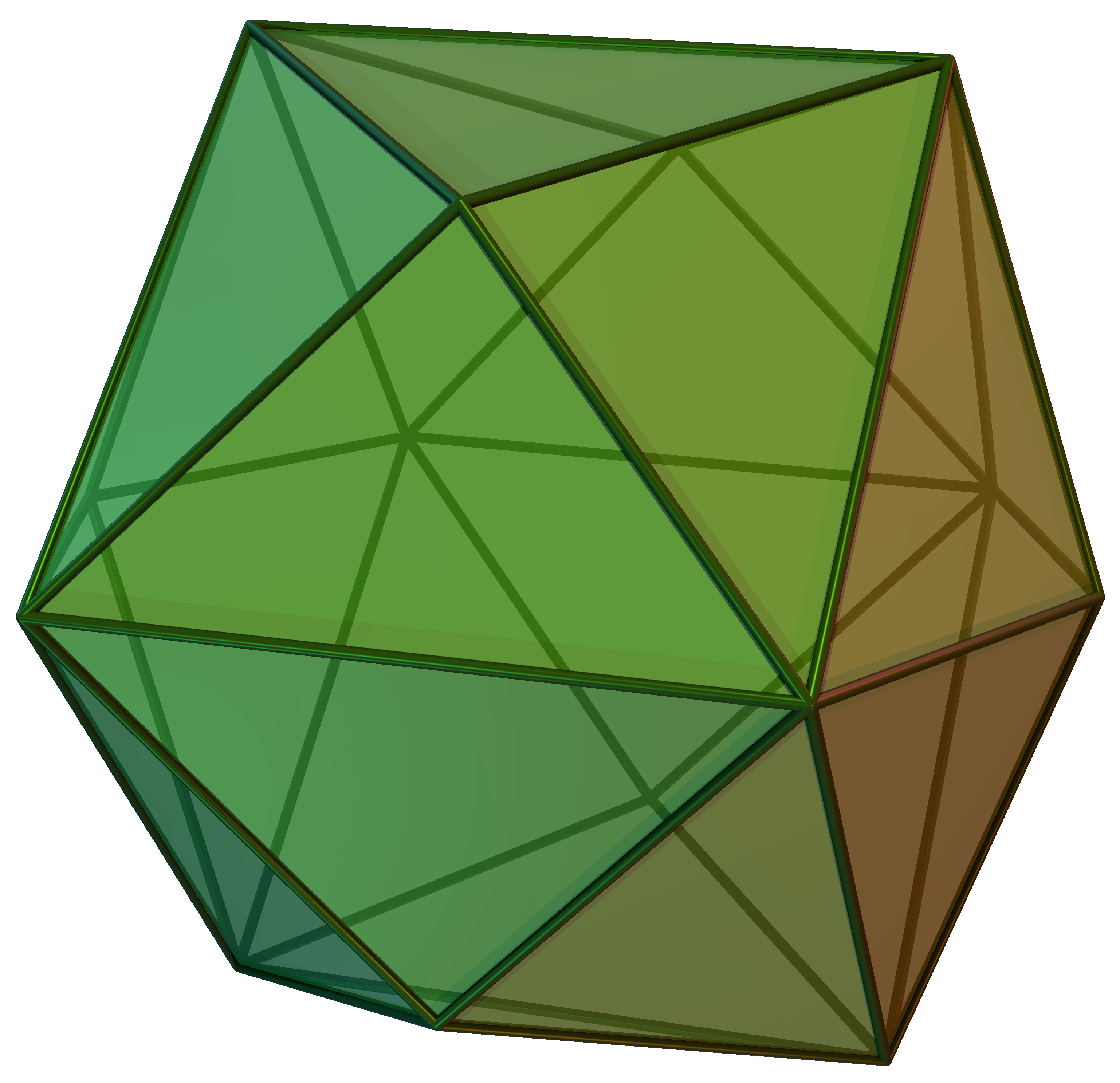
- Type: Catalan solid Kleetope
- Faces: 24
- Edges: 36
- Vertices: 14
- Symmetry group: octahedral symmetry $\mathrm{O}_\mathrm{h}$
- Dual polyhedron: truncated octahedron

Net

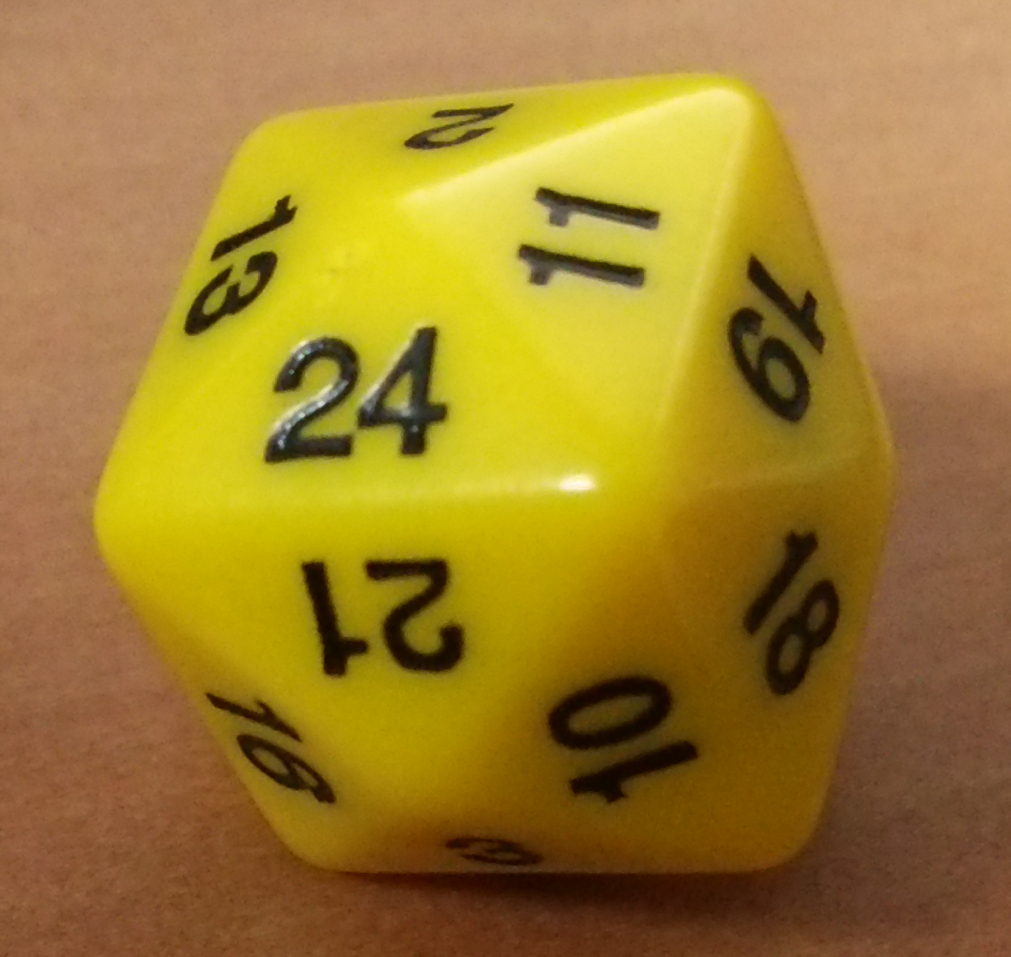
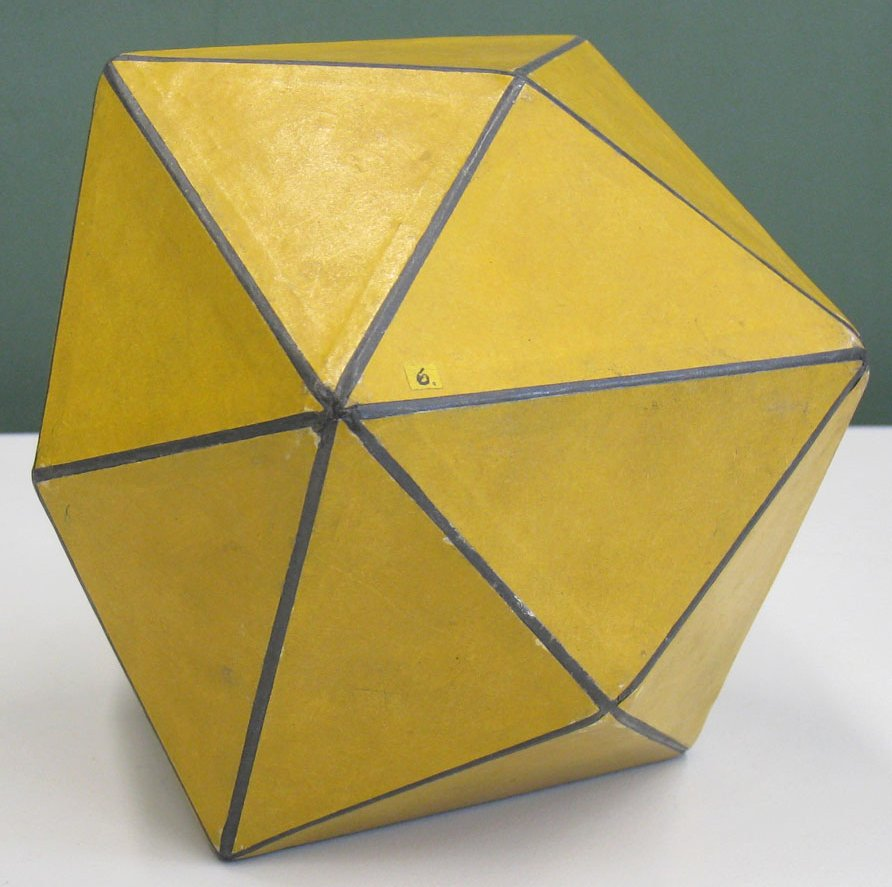
Die and crystal model
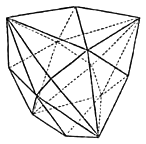
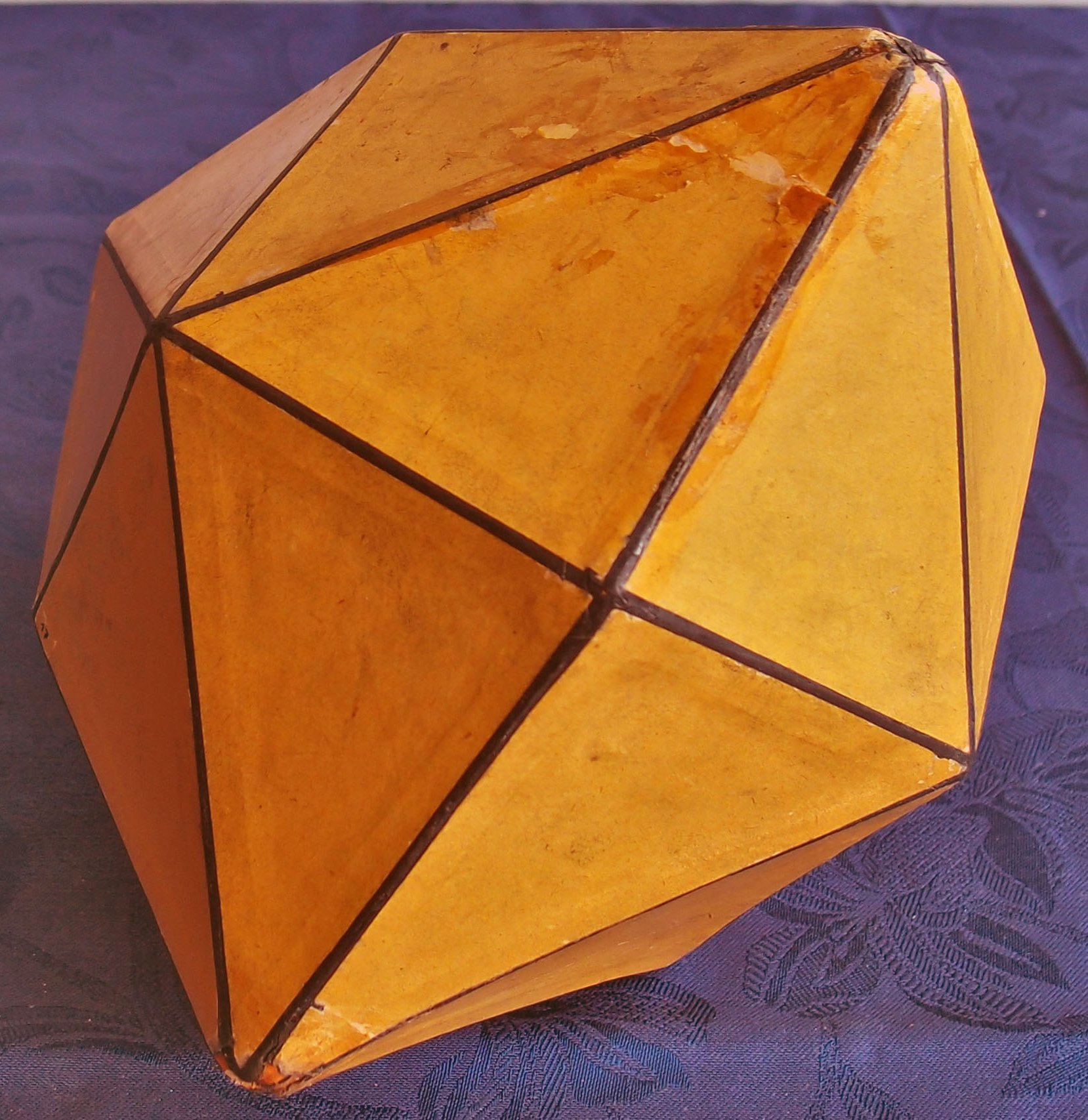
Drawing and crystal model of variant with tetrahedral symmetry called hexakis tetrahedron

In geometry, a tetrakis hexahedron (also known as a tetrakishexahedron, tetrahexahedron, hextetrahedron, tetrakis cube, and kiscube) is a Catalan solid. Its dual is the truncated octahedron, an Archimedean solid.

It can be called a disdyakis hexahedron or hexakis tetrahedron as the dual of an omnitruncated tetrahedron, and as the barycentric subdivision of a tetrahedron.

3D model of a tetrakis hexahedron

== As a Kleetope ==
The name "tetrakis" is used for the Kleetopes of polyhedra with square faces. Hence, the tetrakis hexahedron can be considered as a cube with square pyramids covering each square face, the Kleetope of the cube. The resulting construction can be either convex or non-convex, depending on the square pyramids' height. For the convex result, this solid comprises twenty-four isosceles triangles. A non-convex form of this shape, with equilateral triangle faces, has the same surface geometry as the regular octahedron, and a paper octahedron model can be re-folded into this shape. This form of the tetrakis hexahedron was illustrated by Leonardo da Vinci in Luca Pacioli's Divina proportione.

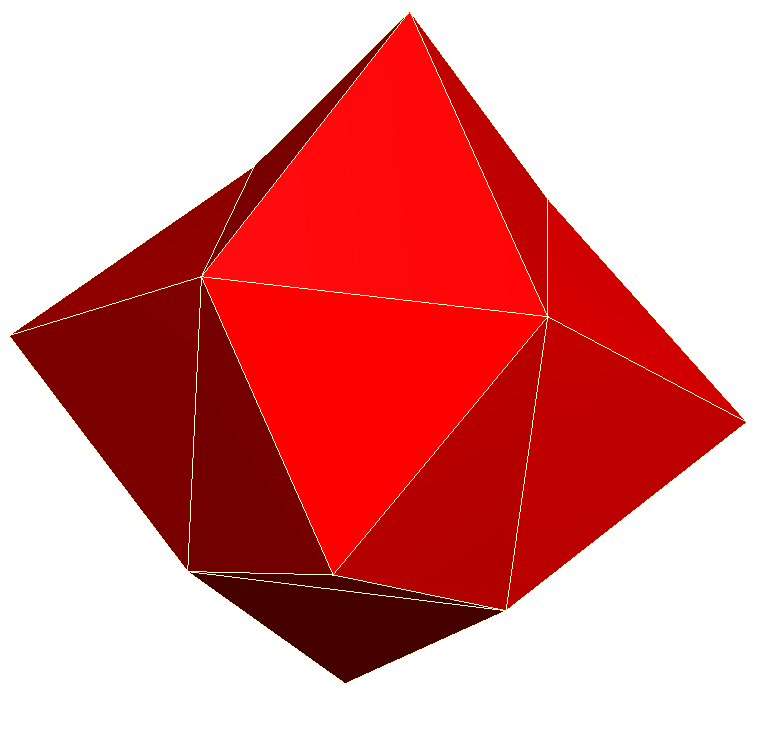
Non-convex tetrakis hexahedron with equilateral triangle faces

Denoting the edge length of the base cube by $a$, the height of each pyramid summit above the cube is $\tfrac{a}{4}$. The inclination of each triangular face of the pyramid versus the cube face is $\arctan\tfrac{1}{2} \approx 26.565^\circ$ (sequence A073000 in the OEIS). One edge of the isosceles triangles has length a, the other two have length $\tfrac{3a}{4},$ which follows by applying the Pythagorean theorem to height and base length. This yields an altitude of $\tfrac{\sqrt 5 a}{4}$ in the triangle (OEIS: A204188). Its area is $\tfrac{\sqrt 5 a^2}{8},$ and the internal angles are $\arccos\tfrac{2}{3} \approx 48.1897^\circ$ and the complementary $180^\circ - 2\arccos\tfrac{2}{3} \approx 83.6206^\circ.$ The volume of the pyramid is $\tfrac{a^3}{12};$ so the total volume of the six pyramids and the cube in the hexahedron is $\tfrac{3a^3}{2}.$

This non-convex form of the tetrakis hexahedron can be folded along the square faces of the inner cube as a net for a four-dimensional cubic pyramid.

== As a Catalan solid ==
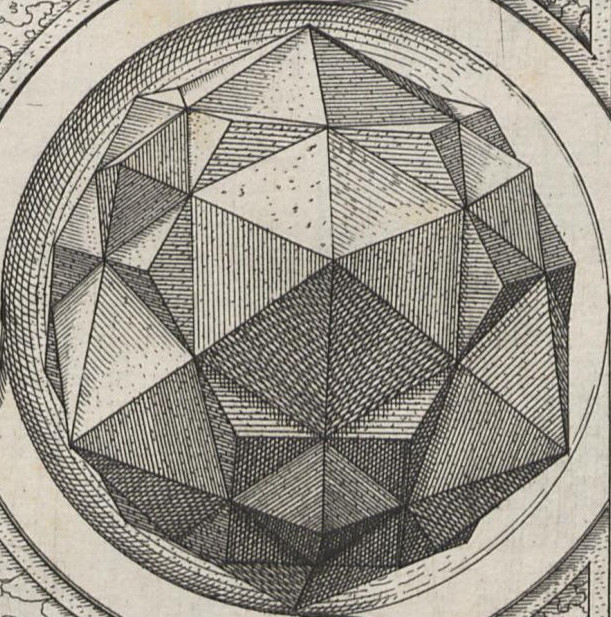
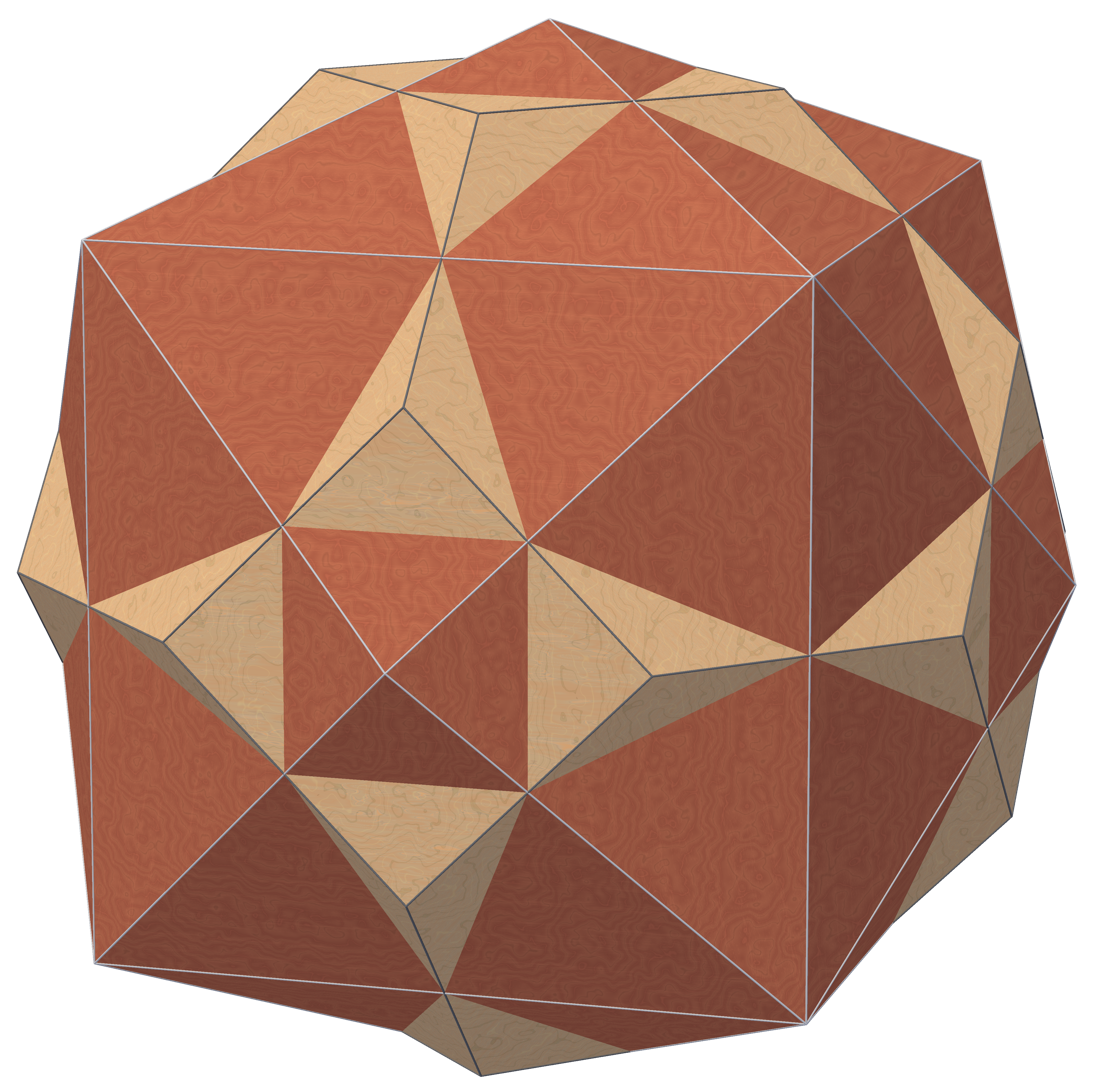
Dual compound of truncated octahedron and tetrakis hexahedron. The woodcut on the left is from Perspectiva Corporum Regularium (1568) by Wenzel Jamnitzer.

The tetrakis hexahedron is a Catalan solid, the dual polyhedron of a truncated octahedron. The truncated octahedron is an Archimedean solid, constructed by cutting all of a regular octahedron's vertices, so the resulting polyhedron has six squares and eight hexagons. The tetrakis hexahedron has the same symmetry as the truncated octahedron, the octahedral symmetry.

Cartesian coordinates for the 14 vertices of a tetrakis hexahedron centered at the origin, are the points
$$\bigl( {\pm\tfrac32}, 0, 0 \bigr),\
\bigl( 0, \pm\tfrac32, 0 \bigr),\
\bigl( 0, 0, \pm\tfrac32 \bigr),\
\bigl({\pm1}, \pm1, \pm1 \bigr).$$

The length of the shorter edges of this tetrakis hexahedron equals 3/2, and that of the longer edges equals 2. The faces are acute isosceles triangles. The larger angle of these equals $\arccos\tfrac19 \approx 83.62^{\circ}$ and the two smaller ones equal $\arccos\tfrac23 \approx 48.19^{\circ}$.

The tetrakis hexahedron is 4-connected: every three of the vertices separate from the remaining vertices, and the graph remains connected. Every 4-connected polyhedron can be realized as the ideal polyhedron, and the tetrakis hexahedron is such.

== Applications ==
Naturally occurring (crystal) formations of tetrahexahedra are observed in copper and fluorite systems.

Polyhedral dice shaped like the tetrakis hexahedron are occasionally used by gamers.

A 24-cell viewed under a vertex-first perspective projection has a surface topology of a tetrakis hexahedron and the geometric proportions of the rhombic dodecahedron, with the rhombic faces divided into two triangles.

The tetrakis hexahedron appears as one of the simplest examples in building theory. Consider the Riemannian symmetric space associated to the group SL_{4}(R). Its Tits boundary has the structure of a spherical building whose apartments are 2-dimensional spheres. The partition of this sphere into spherical simplices (chambers) can be obtained by taking the radial projection of a tetrakis hexahedron.

== Symmetry ==
With tetrahedral symmetry, the triangular faces represent the 24 fundamental domains of tetrahedral symmetry. This polyhedron can be constructed from six great circles on a sphere. It can also be seen by a cube with its square faces triangulated by their vertices and face centers, and a tetrahedron with its faces divided by vertices, mid-edges, and a central point.

== See also ==
- Disdyakis triacontahedron
- Disdyakis dodecahedron
- Kisrhombille tiling
- Compound of three octahedra
- Deltoidal icositetrahedron, another 24-face Catalan solid.
