= Emanuels Grīnbergs =

Latvian mathematician

- Born: 25 January 1911; St. Petersburg, Russian Empire
- Died: 25 April 1982 (aged 63); Rīga, Latvian SSR
- Education: University of Latvia; École Normale Supérieure
- Known for: Grinberg's theorem
- Scientific career
- Fields: Mathematics
- Workplaces: Institute of Physics of the Latvian Academy of Sciences; Computer Center of the University of Latvia

Emanuels Donats Frīdrihs Jānis Grinbergs (1911–1982, westernized as Emanuel Grinberg) was a Latvian mathematician, known for Grinberg's theorem on the Hamiltonicity of planar graphs.

== Biography ==
Grinbergs was born on January 25, 1911, in St. Petersburg, the son of a Lutheran bishop from Latvia. Latvia became independent from Russia in 1917, and on the death of his father in 1923, Grinbergs' family returned to Riga, taking Grinbergs with them.

In 1927, he won a high school mathematics competition, the prize for which was to study in Lille, France. He then studied mathematics at the University of Latvia beginning in 1930. On graduating in 1934, he won a prize that again funded study in France; he did graduate studies in 1935 and 1936 at the École Normale Supérieure in Paris, during which he published his first paper, in geometry. He returned to the University of Latvia as a privatdozent in 1937, and joined the faculty as a dozent in 1940. His lectures at that time covered subjects including geometry, probability theory, and group theory. While there, he defended a thesis in geometry at the University of Latvia in 1943, entitled On Oscillations, Superoscillations and Characteristic Points.

In the meantime, the Soviet Union had annexed Latvia in 1940, and the army of Nazi Germany had occupied it and incorporated it into the Reichskommissariat Ostland. Grinbergs was drafted into the Latvian Legion, part of the German military, in 1944. After the war, because of his service as a German soldier, he was held prisoner in a camp in Kutaisi, Georgia, until 1946; he lost his university position, and his doctorate (awarded during the German occupation) was annulled.

Grinbergs returned to Latvia, where he became a factory worker in the Radiotehnika radio factory, while continuing to be interrogated regularly by the KGB. He developed mathematical models of electrical circuits, which he wrote up as a second thesis, Problems of analysis and synthesis of simple linear circuits, his defense of which earned him a candidate degree.

In 1954, Grinbergs was allowed to return to the University of Latvia faculty. In 1956, he joined the Institute of Physics of the Latvian Academy of Sciences, and in 1960, he began working at the Computer Center of the University of Latvia, where he remained for the rest of his career, eventually becoming Chief Scientist there.

== Research ==
A non-Hamiltonian planar graph found by Grinbergs

Grinbergs' initial research interests were in geometry, and later shifted to graph theory. With professors Arins and Daube at the University of Latvia, Grinbergs was one of the first to work in applied mathematics and computer science in Latvia.

Grinbergs and his collaborators wrote many papers on the design of electrical circuits and electronic filters, stemming from his radio work. He earned the State Prize of the Latvian SSR in 1980 for his research on nonlinear electronic circuit theory.

Another early line of research by Grinbergs at the Computer Center concerned the automated design of ship hulls, and the computations with spline curves and surfaces needed in this design. The goal of this research was to calculate patterns for cutting and then bending flat steel plates so that they could be welded together to form ship hulls without the need for additional machining after the bending step; the methods developed by Grinbergs were later used throughout the Soviet Union.

In graph theory, Grinbergs is best known for Grinberg's theorem, a necessary condition for a planar graph to have a Hamiltonian cycle that has been frequently used to find non-Hamiltonian planar graphs with other special properties. His researches in graph theory also concerned graph coloring, graph isomorphism, cycles in directed graphs, and a counterexample to a conjecture of András Ádám on the number of cycles in tournaments.

Other topics in Grinbergs' research include Steiner triple systems, magnetohydrodynamics, operations research, and the mathematical modeling of hydrocarbon exploration.
