= Convex embedding =

In geometric graph theory, a convex embedding of a graph is an embedding of the graph into a Euclidean space, with its vertices represented as points and its edges as line segments, so that all of the vertices outside a specified subset belong to the convex hull of their neighbors. More precisely, if $X$ is a subset of the vertices of the graph, then a convex $X$-embedding embeds the graph in such a way that every vertex either belongs to $X$ or is placed within the convex hull of its neighbors. A convex embedding into $d$-dimensional Euclidean space is said to be in general position if every subset $S$ of its vertices spans a subspace of dimension $\min(d,|S|-1)$.

Convex embeddings were introduced by W. T. Tutte in 1963. Tutte showed that if the outer face $F$ of a planar graph is fixed to the shape of a given convex polygon in the plane, and the remaining vertices are placed by solving a system of linear equations describing the behavior of ideal springs on the edges of the graph, then the result will be a convex $F$-embedding. More strongly, every face of an embedding constructed in this way will be a convex polygon, resulting in a convex drawing of the graph.

Beyond planarity, convex embeddings gained interest from a 1988 result of Nati Linial, László Lovász, and Avi Wigderson that a graph is k-vertex-connected if and only if it has a $(k-1)$-dimensional convex $S$-embedding in general position, for some $S$ of $k$ of its vertices, and that if it is k-vertex-connected then such an embedding can be constructed in polynomial time by choosing $S$ to be any subset of $k$ vertices, and solving Tutte's system of linear equations.

One-dimensional convex embeddings (in general position), for a specified set of two vertices, are equivalent to bipolar orientations of the given graph.
