= Graph toughness =

In this graph, removing the four red vertices would produce four connected components (depicted in four different colours). However, there is no set of k vertices whose removal leaves more than k components. Therefore, its toughness is exactly 1.

In graph theory, toughness is a measure of the connectivity of a graph. A graph G is said to be t-tough for a given real number t if, for every integer k > 1, G cannot be split into k different connected components by the removal of fewer than tk vertices. For instance, a graph is 1-tough if the number of components formed by removing a set of vertices is always at most as large as the number of removed vertices. The toughness of a graph is the maximum t for which it is t-tough; this is a finite number for all finite graphs except the complete graphs, which by convention have infinite toughness.

Graph toughness was first introduced by Václav Chvátal (1973). Since then there has been extensive work by other mathematicians on toughness; the recent survey by Bauer, Broersma & Schmeichel (2006) lists 99 theorems and 162 papers on the subject.

== Examples ==
Removing k vertices from a path graph can split the remaining graph into as many as k + 1 connected components. The maximum ratio of components to removed vertices is achieved by removing one vertex (from the interior of the path) and splitting it into two components. Therefore, paths are 1/2-tough. In contrast, removing k vertices from a cycle graph leaves at most k remaining connected components, and sometimes leaves exactly k connected components, so a cycle is 1-tough.

== Connection to vertex connectivity ==
If a graph is t-tough, then one consequence (obtained by setting k = 2) is that any set of 2t − 1 nodes can be removed without splitting the graph in two. That is, every t-tough graph is also 2t-vertex-connected.

== Connection to Hamiltonicity ==
Unsolved problem in mathematics:
Is there a number $t$ such that every $t$-tough graph is Hamiltonian?
(more unsolved problems in mathematics)

Chvátal (1973) observed that every cycle, and therefore every Hamiltonian graph, is 1-tough; that is, being 1-tough is a necessary condition for a graph to be Hamiltonian. He conjectured that the connection between toughness and Hamiltonicity goes in both directions: that there exists a threshold t such that every t-tough graph is Hamiltonian. Chvátal's original conjecture that t = 2 would have proven Fleischner's theorem but was disproved by Bauer, Broersma & Veldman (2000). The existence of a larger toughness threshold for Hamiltonicity remains open, and is sometimes called Chvátal's toughness conjecture.

== Computational complexity ==
Testing whether a graph is 1-tough is co-NP-complete. That is, the decision problem whose answer is "yes" for a graph that is not 1-tough, and "no" for a graph that is 1-tough, is NP-complete. The same is true for any fixed positive rational number q: testing whether a graph is q-tough is co-NP-complete (Bauer, Hakimi & Schmeichel 1990).

== See also ==
- Strength of a graph, an analogous concept for edge deletions
- Tutte–Berge formula, a related characterization of the size of a maximum matching in a graph
- Harris graphs, a family of graphs that are tough, Eulerian, and non-Hamiltonian
