= Rectified prism =

Type of polyhedron

Set of rectified prisms
Rectified pentagonal prism
| Conway polyhedron notation | aPn |
| Faces | 2 n-gons n squares 2n triangles |
| Edges | 6n |
| Vertices | 3n |
| Symmetry group | D_{nh}, [2,2n], (*22n), order 4n |
| Rotation group | D_{n}, [2,n]^{+}, (22n), order 2n |
| Dual polyhedron | Joined prism |
| Properties | convex |

In geometry, a rectified prism (also rectified bipyramid) is one of an infinite set of polyhedra, constructed as a rectification of an n-gonal prism, truncating the vertices down to the midpoint of the original edges. In Conway polyhedron notation, it is represented as aPn, an ambo-prism. The lateral squares or rectangular faces of the prism become squares or rhombic faces, and new isosceles triangle faces are truncations of the original vertices.

== Elements ==
An n-gonal form has 3n vertices, 6n edges, and 2+3n faces: 2 regular n-gons, n rhombi, and 2n triangles.

== Forms ==
The rectified square prism is the same as a semiregular cuboctahedron.

| n | 3 | 4 | 5 | 6 | 7 | n |
|---|---|---|---|---|---|---|
| Image | | | | | | |
| Net | | | | | | |
| Related | | Cuboctahedron | | | | |

Rectified star prisms also exist, like a 5/2 form:

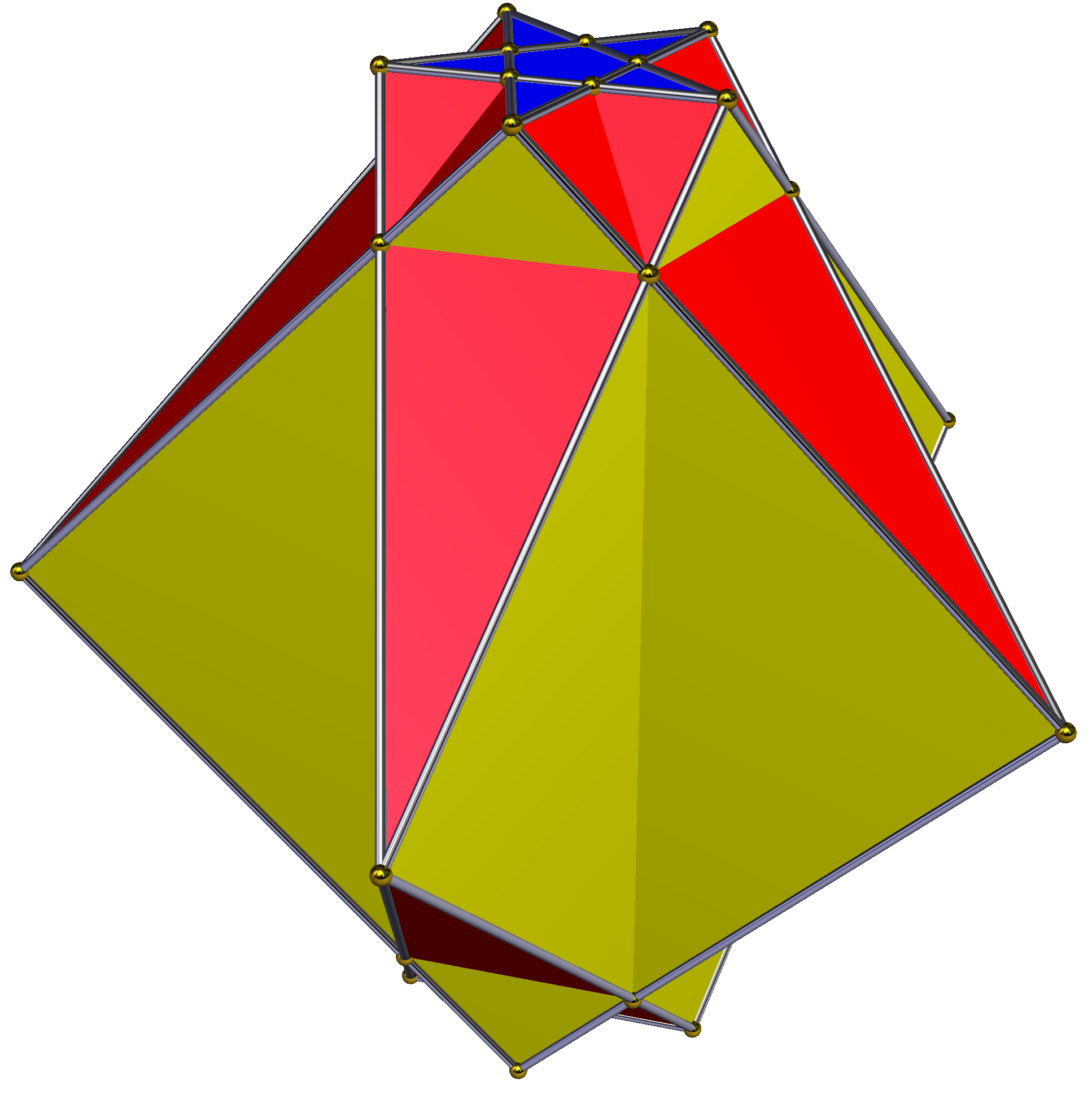

== Dual ==
Set of joined prisms
Joined pentagonal prism
| Conway polyhedron notation | jPn |
| Faces | 3n |
| Edges | 6n |
| Vertices | 2+3n |
| Symmetry group | D_{nh}, [2,2n], (*22n), order 4n |
| Rotation group | D_{n}, [2,n]^{+}, (22n), order 2n |
| Dual polyhedron | Rectified prism Rectified bipyramid |
| Properties | convex |

The dual of a rectified prism is a joined prism or joined bipyramid, in Conway polyhedron notation. The join operation adds vertices at the center of faces, and replaces edges with rhombic faces between original and the neighboring face centers. The joined square prism is the same topology as the rhombic dodecahedron. The joined triangular prism is the Herschel graph.

| n | 3 | 4 | 5 | 6 | 8 | n |
|---|---|---|---|---|---|---|
| Image | | | | | | |
| Net | | | | | | |
| Related | | Rhombic dodecahedron | | | | |

== See also ==
- Rectified antiprism
