= Tait's conjecture =

Disproven graph theory

In mathematics, Tait's conjecture states that "Every 3-connected planar cubic graph has a Hamiltonian cycle (along the edges) through all its vertices". It was proposed by P. G. Tait (1884) and disproved by W. T. Tutte (1946), who constructed a counterexample with 25 faces, 69 edges and 46 vertices. Several smaller counterexamples, with 21 faces, 57 edges and 38 vertices, were later proved minimal by Holton & McKay (1988). The condition that the graph be 3-regular is necessary due to polyhedra such as the rhombic dodecahedron, which forms a bipartite graph with six degree-four vertices on one side and eight degree-three vertices on the other side; because any Hamiltonian cycle would have to alternate between the two sides of the bipartition, but they have unequal numbers of vertices, the rhombic dodecahedron is not Hamiltonian.

The conjecture was significant, because if true, it would have implied the four color theorem: as Tait described, the four-color problem is equivalent to the problem of finding 3-edge-colorings of bridgeless cubic planar graphs. In a Hamiltonian cubic planar graph, such an edge coloring is easy to find: use two colors alternately on the cycle, and a third color for all remaining edges. Alternatively, a 4-coloring of the faces of a Hamiltonian cubic planar graph may be constructed directly, using two colors for the faces inside the cycle and two more colors for the faces outside.

== Tutte's counterexample ==
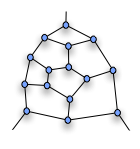

=== Tutte's fragment ===
The key to this counter-example is what is now known as Tutte's fragment, shown on the right.

If this fragment is part of a larger graph, then any Hamiltonian cycle through the graph must go in or out of the top vertex (and either one of the lower ones). It cannot go in one lower vertex and out the other.

=== The counterexample ===
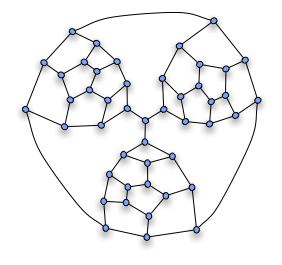

The fragment can then be used to construct the non-Hamiltonian Tutte graph, by putting together three such fragments as shown in the picture. The "compulsory" edges of the fragments, that must be part of any Hamiltonian path through the fragment, are connected at the central vertex; because any cycle can use only two of these three edges, there can be no Hamiltonian cycle.

The resulting Tutte graph is 3-connected and planar, so by Steinitz' theorem it is the graph of a polyhedron. In total it has 25 faces, 69 edges and 46 vertices. It can be realized geometrically from a tetrahedron (the faces of which correspond to the four large faces in the drawing, three of which are between pairs of fragments and the fourth of which forms the exterior) by multiply truncating three of its vertices.

=== Smaller counterexamples ===
As Holton & McKay (1988) show, there are exactly six 38-vertex non-Hamiltonian polyhedra that have nontrivial three-edge cuts. They are formed by replacing two of the vertices of a pentagonal prism by the same fragment used in Tutte's example.

== See also ==
- Grinberg's theorem, a necessary condition on the existence of a Hamiltonian cycle that can be used to show that a graph forms a counterexample to Tait's conjecture
- Barnette's conjecture, a still-open refinement of Tait's conjecture stating that every bipartite cubic polyhedral graph is Hamiltonian.
- Tutte's theorem on Hamiltonian cycles, a refinement of Tait's conjecture for 4-vertex-connected planar graphs
