= Polyhedral graph =

Graph made from vertices and edges of a convex polyhedron

The polyhedral graph formed as the Schlegel diagram of a regular dodecahedron.

In geometric graph theory, a branch of mathematics, a polyhedral graph is the undirected graph formed from the vertices and edges of a convex polyhedron. Alternatively, in purely graph-theoretic terms, the polyhedral graphs are the 3-vertex-connected, planar graphs. The analogue concept for polytopes of general dimension are the polytopal graphs.

== Characterization ==
The Schlegel diagram of a convex polyhedron represents its vertices and edges as points and line segments in the Euclidean plane, forming a subdivision of an outer convex polygon into smaller convex polygons (a convex drawing of the graph of the polyhedron). It has no crossings, so every polyhedral graph is also a planar graph. Additionally, by Balinski's theorem, it is a 3-vertex-connected graph.

According to Steinitz's theorem, these two graph-theoretic properties are enough to completely characterize the polyhedral graphs: they are exactly the 3-vertex-connected planar graphs. That is, whenever a graph is both planar and 3-vertex-connected, there exists a polyhedron whose vertices and edges form an isomorphic graph. Given such a graph, a representation of it as a subdivision of a convex polygon into smaller convex polygons may be found using the Tutte embedding.

== Hamiltonicity and shortness ==
Tait conjectured that every cubic polyhedral graph (that is, a polyhedral graph in which each vertex is incident to exactly three edges) has a Hamiltonian cycle, but this conjecture was disproved by a counterexample of W. T. Tutte, the polyhedral but non-Hamiltonian Tutte graph. If one relaxes the requirement that the graph be cubic, there are much smaller non-Hamiltonian polyhedral graphs. The graph with the fewest vertices and edges is the 11-vertex and 18-edge Herschel graph, and there also exists an 11-vertex non-Hamiltonian polyhedral graph in which all faces are triangles, the Goldner–Harary graph.

More strongly, there exists a constant $\alpha<1$ (the shortness exponent) and an infinite family of polyhedral graphs such that the length of the longest simple path of an $n$-vertex graph in the family is $O(n^{\alpha})$.

A problem with one additional constraint exists, Barnette's conjecture, asking whether every cubic bipartite polyhedral graph is Hamiltonian, which remains unsolved.

== Combinatorial enumeration ==
Duijvestijn provides a count of the polyhedral graphs with up to 26 edges; The number of these graphs with 6, 7, 8, ... edges is

1, 0, 1, 2, 2, 4, 12, 22, 58, 158, 448, 1342, 4199, 13384, 43708, 144810, ... (sequence A002840 in the OEIS).

One may also enumerate the polyhedral graphs by their numbers of vertices: for graphs with 4, 5, 6, ... vertices, the number of polyhedral graphs is

1, 2, 7, 34, 257, 2606, 32300, 440564, 6384634, 96262938, 1496225352, ... (sequence A000944 in the OEIS).

== Special cases ==
Orthographic projections and Schlegel diagrams with Hamiltonian cycles of the vertices of the five platonic solids – only the octahedron has an Eulerian path or cycle, by extending its path with the dotted one

The vertex-edge graphs of the Platonic solids are also called Platonic graphs. As well as having all the other properties of polyhedral graphs, these are symmetric graphs, and all of them have Hamiltonian cycles. There are five of these graphs:

- Tetrahedral graph – 4 vertices, 6 edges
- Octahedral graph – 6 vertices, 12 edges
- Cubical graph – 8 vertices, 12 edges
- Icosahedral graph – 12 vertices, 30 edges
- Dodecahedral graph – 20 vertices, 30 edges

A polyhedral graph is the graph of a simple polyhedron if it is cubic (every vertex has three edges), and it is the graph of a simplicial polyhedron if it is a maximal planar graph. For example, the tetrahedral, cubical, and dodecahedral graphs are simple; the tetrahedral, octahedral, and icosahedral graphs are simplicial.

The Halin graphs, graphs formed from a planar embedded tree by adding an outer cycle connecting all of the leaves of the tree, form another important subclass of the polyhedral graphs.

== See also ==
- Archimedean graph
