= Edge (geometry) =

Line segment joining two adjacent vertices in a polygon or polytope

Three edges AB, BC, and CA, each between two vertices of a triangle

A polygon is bounded by edges; this square has 4 edges.

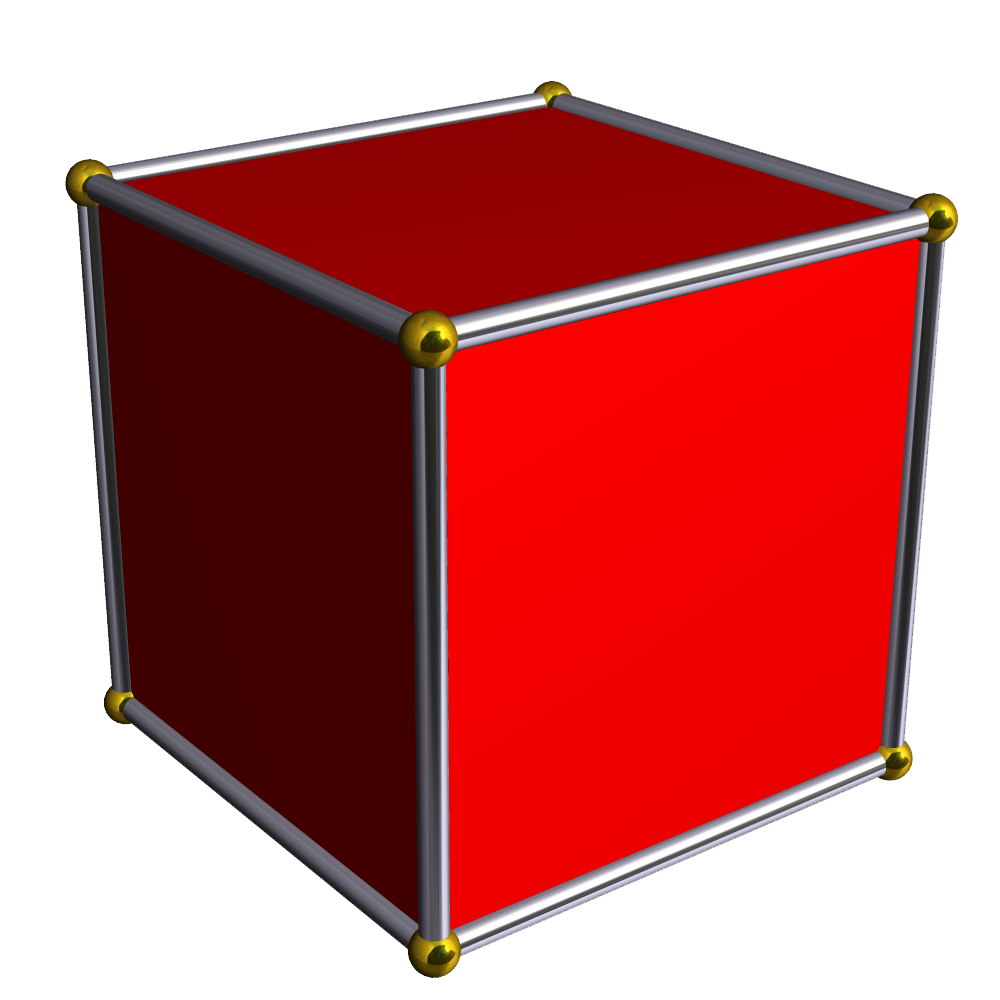
Every edge is shared by two faces in a polyhedron, like this cube.

Every edge is shared by three or more faces in a 4-polytope, as seen in this projection of a tesseract.

In geometry, an edge is a particular type of line segment joining two vertices in a polygon, polyhedron, or higher-dimensional polytope. In a polygon, an edge is a line segment on the boundary, and is often called a polygon side. In a polyhedron or more generally a polytope, an edge is a line segment where two faces (or polyhedron sides) meet. A segment joining two vertices while passing through the interior or exterior is not an edge but instead is called a diagonal.

An edge may also be an infinite line separating two half-planes. The sides of a plane angle are semi-infinite half-lines (or rays).

== Relation to edges in graphs ==
In graph theory, an edge is an abstract object connecting two graph vertices, unlike polygon and polyhedron edges which have a concrete geometric representation as a line segment. However, any polyhedron can be represented by its skeleton or edge-skeleton, a graph whose vertices are the geometric vertices of the polyhedron and whose edges correspond to the geometric edges. Conversely, the graphs that are skeletons of three-dimensional polyhedra can be characterized by Steinitz's theorem as being exactly the 3-vertex-connected planar graphs.

== Number of edges in a polyhedron ==
Any convex polyhedron's surface has Euler characteristic
$$V - E + F = 2,$$
where V is the number of vertices, E is the number of edges, and F is the number of faces. This equation is known as Euler's polyhedron formula. Thus the number of edges is 2 less than the sum of the numbers of vertices and faces. For example, a cube has 8 vertices and 6 faces, and hence 12 edges.

== Incidences with other faces ==
In a polygon, two edges meet at each vertex; more generally, by Balinski's theorem, at least d edges meet at every vertex of a d-dimensional convex polytope. Similarly, in a polyhedron, exactly two two-dimensional faces meet at every edge, while in higher dimensional polytopes three or more two-dimensional faces meet at every edge.

== Alternative terminology ==
In the theory of high-dimensional convex polytopes, a facet or side of a d-dimensional polytope is one of its (d − 1)-dimensional features, a ridge is a (d − 2)-dimensional feature, and a peak is a (d − 3)-dimensional feature. Thus, the edges of a polygon are its facets, the edges of a 3-dimensional convex polyhedron are its ridges, and the edges of a 4-dimensional polytope are its peaks.

== See also ==
- Base (geometry)
- Extended side
