= Tutte's theorem =

Tutte's theorem may refer to several theorems of W. T. Tutte, including:

- Tutte's theorem on Hamiltonian cycles, the existence of Hamiltonian cycles in 4-vertex-connected planar graphs
- Tutte's theorem on perfect matchings, a characterization of the graphs having perfect matchings
- Tutte's spring theorem, on the planarity and uniqueness of graph drawings obtained from systems of idealized springs
- Tutte homotopy theorem, on the composition of generalized paths in matroids

== See also ==
- Hanani–Tutte theorem on the parity of edge crossings in graph drawings
