= Toroidal graph =

Graph able to be embedded on a torus

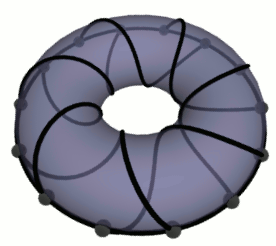
A cubic graph with 14 vertices embedded on a torus

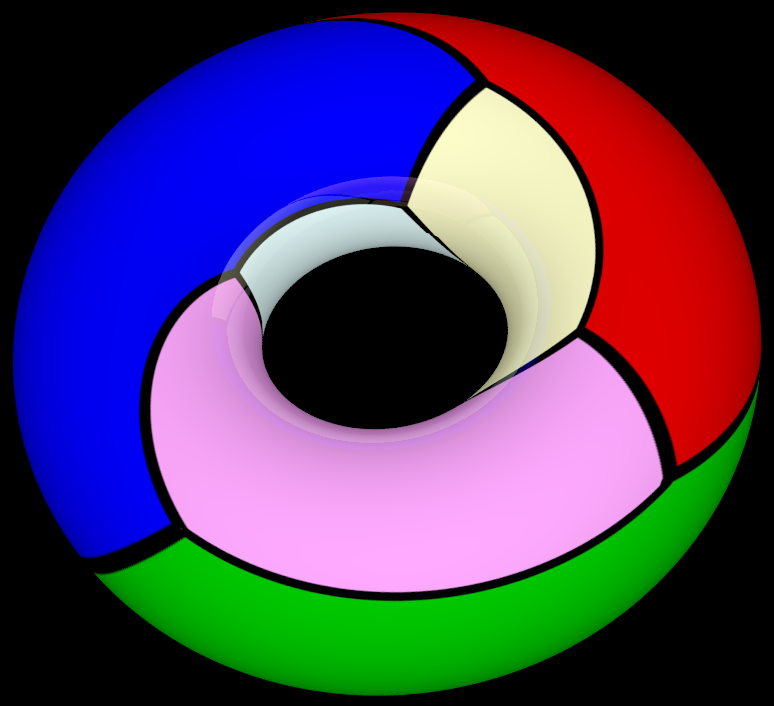
The Heawood graph and associated map embedded in the torus.

In the mathematical field of graph theory, a toroidal graph is a graph that can be embedded on a torus. In other words, the graph's vertices and edges can be placed on a torus such that no edges intersect except at a vertex that belongs to both.

== Examples ==
Any graph that can be embedded in a plane can also be embedded in a torus, so every planar graph is also a toroidal graph. A toroidal graph that cannot be embedded in a plane is said to have genus 1.

The Heawood graph, the complete graph K_{7} (and hence K_{5} and K_{6}), the Petersen graph (and hence the complete bipartite graph K_{3,3}, since the Petersen graph contains a subdivision of it), one of the Blanuša snarks, and all Möbius ladders are toroidal. More generally, any graph with crossing number 1 is toroidal. Some graphs with greater crossing numbers are also toroidal: the Möbius–Kantor graph, for example, has crossing number 4 and is toroidal.

== Properties ==
Any toroidal graph has chromatic number at most 7. The complete graph K_{7} provides an example of a toroidal graph with chromatic number 7.

Any triangle-free toroidal graph has chromatic number at most 4.

By a result analogous to Fáry's theorem, any toroidal graph may be drawn with straight edges in a rectangle with periodic boundary conditions. Furthermore, the analogue of Tutte's spring theorem applies in this case. Toroidal graphs also have book embeddings with at most 7 pages.

== Obstructions ==
By the Robertson–Seymour theorem, there exists a finite set H of minimal non-toroidal graphs, such that a graph is toroidal if and only if it has no graph minor in H. That is, H forms the set of forbidden minors for the toroidal graphs. The complete set H is not known, but it has at least 17,523 graphs. Alternatively, there are at least 250,815 non-toroidal graphs that are minimal in the topological minor ordering. A graph is toroidal if and only if it has none of these graphs as a topological minor.

== Gallery ==
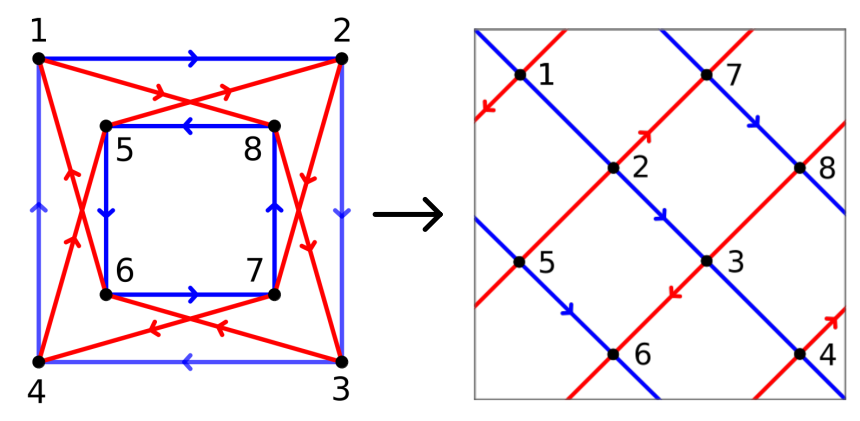
Two isomorphic Cayley graphs of the quaternion group.

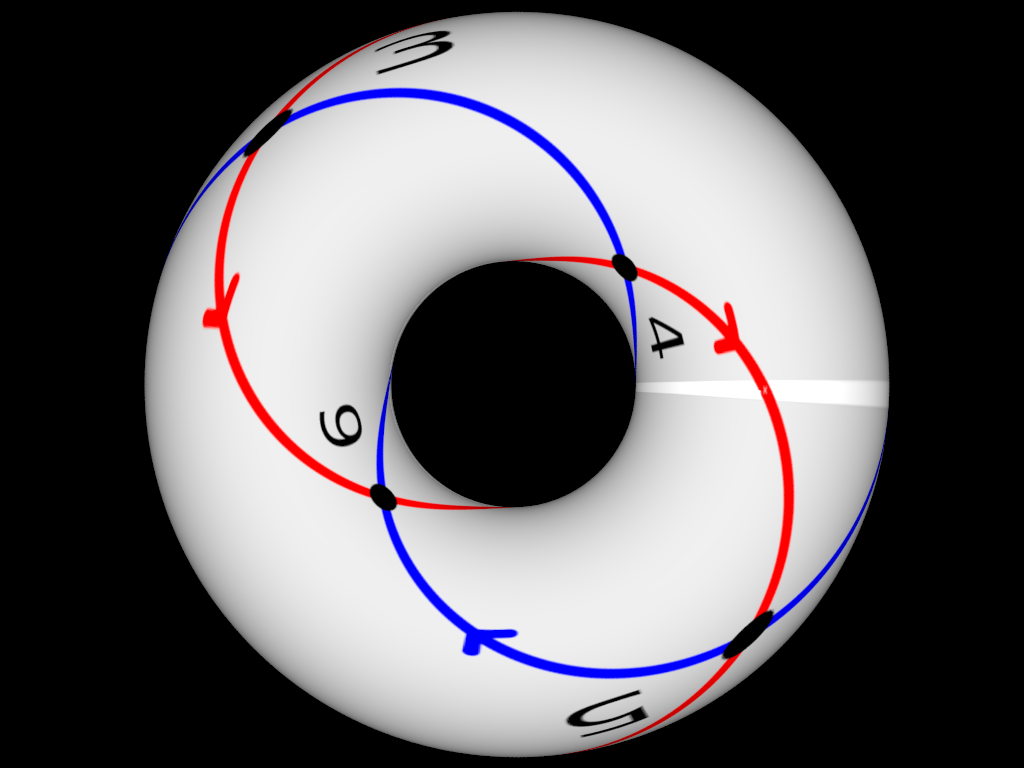
Cayley graph of the quaternion group embedded in the torus.

Video of Cayley graph of the quaternion group embedded in the torus.

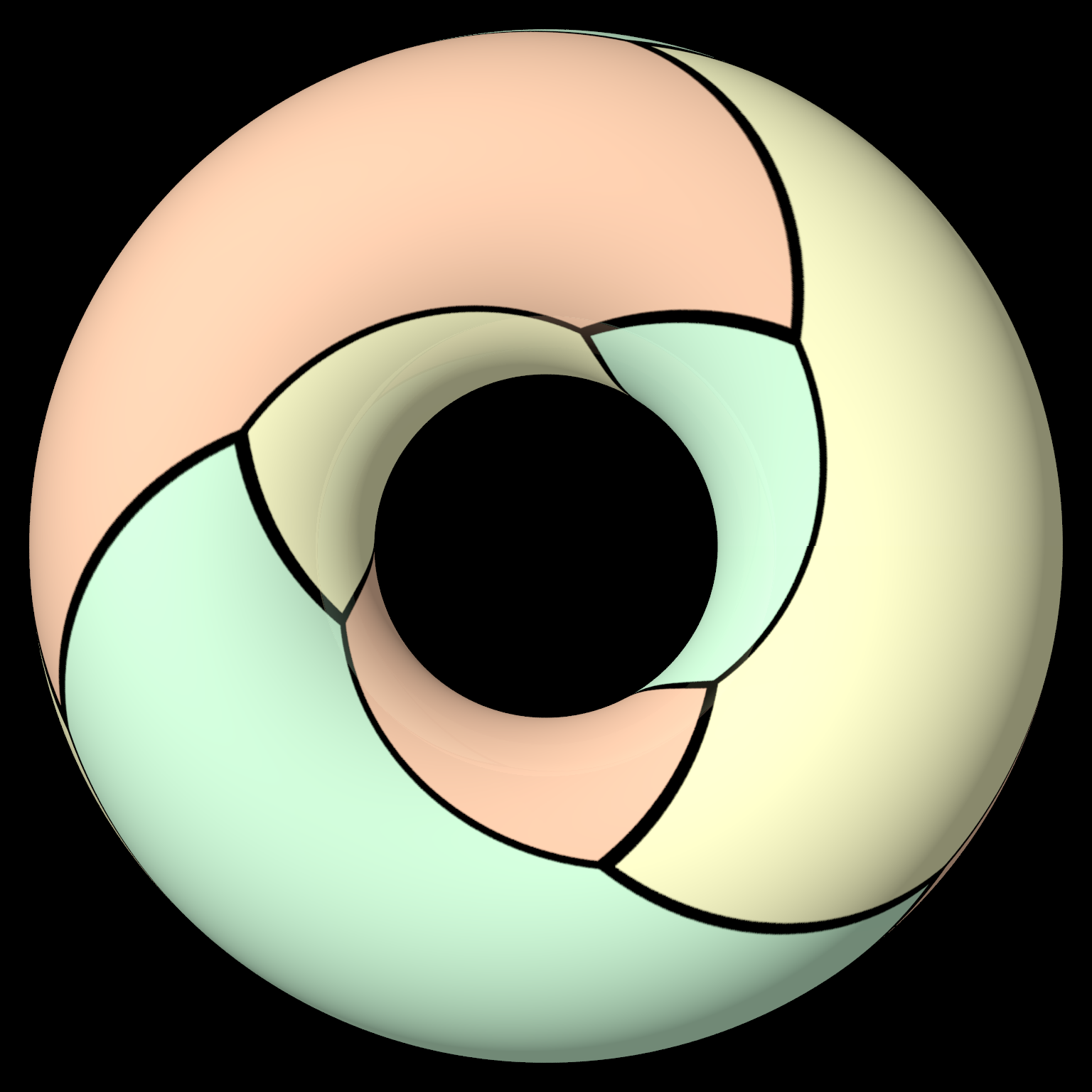
The Pappus graph and associated map embedded in the torus.

== See also ==
- Grünbaum–Nash-Williams conjecture, on Hamiltonian cycles in 4-vertex-connected toroidal graphs
- Topological graph theory
- Toroidal polyhedron
