= W. G. Brown =

Canadian mathematician

William G. Brown is a Canadian mathematician specializing in graph theory. He is a professor emeritus of mathematics at McGill University.

== Education and career ==
Brown earned his Ph.D. from the University of Toronto in 1963, under the joint supervision of Harold Scott MacDonald Coxeter and W. T. Tutte. His dissertation was Enumeration Problems Of Linear Graph Theory (Problems in the Enumeration of Maps).

In 1968, he moved to McGill from the University of British Columbia as an associate professor.

== Contributions ==
Brown's dissertation research concerned graph enumeration, and his early publications continued in that direction.^{[E]}^{[T]} However, much of his later work was in extremal graph theory. He is known for formulating the Ruzsa–Szemerédi problem on the density of systems of triples in which no six points contain more than two triples in joint work with Paul Erdős and Vera T. Sós,^{[A]}^{[B]} and for his constructions of dense $K_{3,3}$-free graphs in connection with the Zarankiewicz problem.^{[Z]}

== Selected publications ==
E.	Brown, William G. (1964), "Enumeration of triangulations of the disk", Proceedings of the London Mathematical Society, Third Series, 14 (4): 746–768, doi:10.1112/plms/s3-14.4.746, MR 0168485

T.	Brown, W. G.; Tutte, W. T. (1964), "On the enumeration of rooted non-separable planar maps", Canadian Journal of Mathematics, 16: 572–577, doi:10.4153/CJM-1964-058-7, MR 0177906

Z.	Brown, W. G. (1966), "On graphs that do not contain a Thomsen graph", Canadian Mathematical Bulletin, 9 (3): 281–285, doi:10.4153/CMB-1966-036-2, MR 0200182

A.	Brown, W. G.; Erdős, P.; Sós, V. T. (1973), "Some extremal problems on r-graphs" (PDF), New Directions in the Theory of Graphs (Proc. Third Ann Arbor Conf., Univ. Michigan, Ann Arbor, Mich, 1971), New York: Academic Press: 53–63, MR 0351888

B.	Sós, V. T.; Erdős, P.; Brown, W. G. (1973), "On the existence of triangulated spheres in 3-graphs, and related problems" (PDF), Periodica Mathematica Hungarica, 3 (3–4): 221–228, doi:10.1007/BF02018585, MR 0323647, S2CID 2604542
