= István Fáry =

Hungarian-born mathematician (1922–1984)

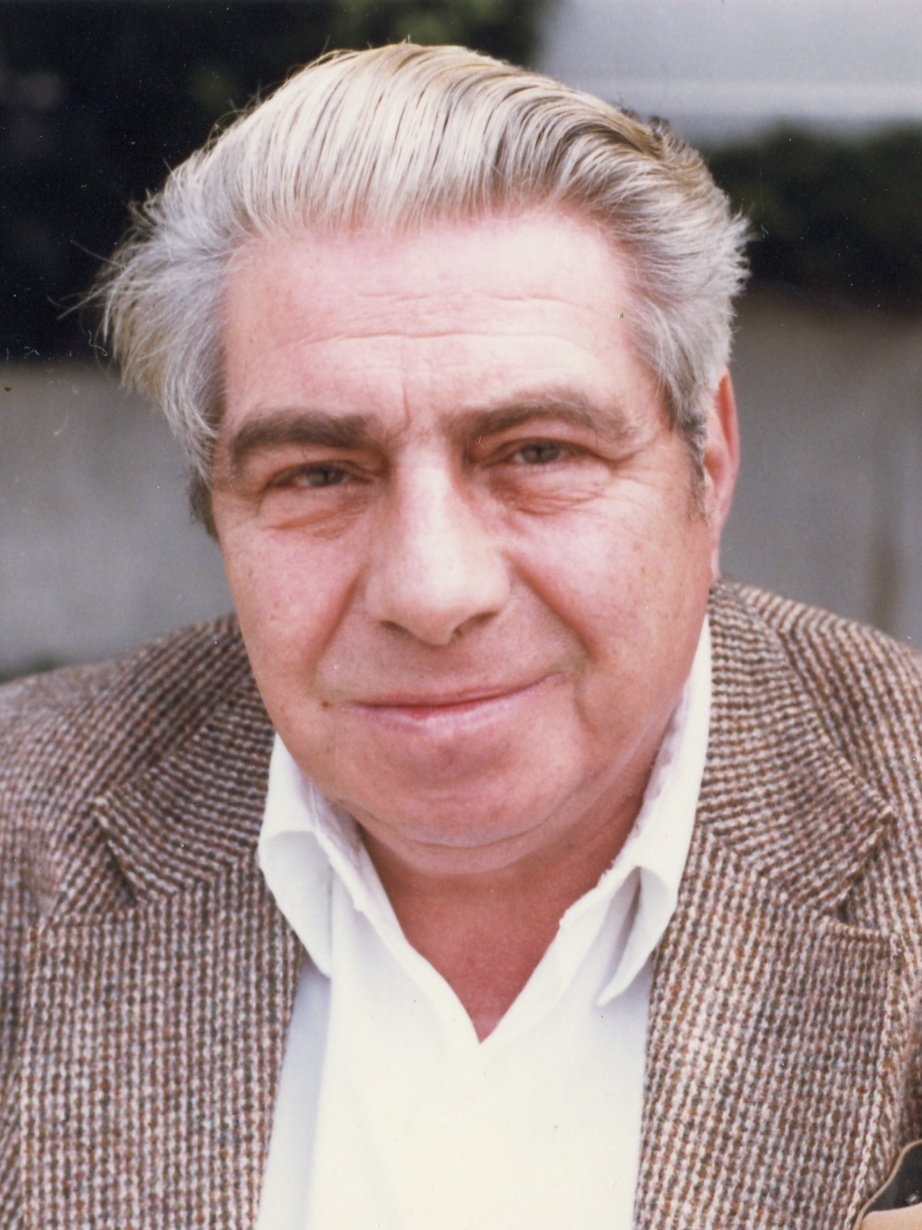
- Fary in Berkeley, 1982
- Born: 30 June 1922; Gyula, Hungary
- Died: 2 November 1984 (aged 62); El Cerrito, California
- Education: University of Paris
- Known for: Knot theory
- Scientific career
- Fields: Mathematics
- Workplaces: University of California, Berkeley
- Doctoral advisor: Jean Leray

István Fáry (30 June 1922 – 2 November 1984) was a Hungarian-born mathematician known for his work in geometry and algebraic topology. He proved Fáry's theorem that every planar graph has a straight-line embedding in 1948, and the Fáry–Milnor theorem lower-bounding the curvature of a nontrivial knot in 1949.

== Biography ==
Fáry was born June 30, 1922, in Gyula, Hungary. After studying for a master's degree at the University of Budapest, he moved to the University of Szeged, where he earned a Ph.D. in 1947. He then studied at the Sorbonne before taking a faculty position at the University of Montreal in 1955. He moved to the University of California, Berkeley in 1958 and became a full professor in 1962. He died on November 2, 1984, in El Cerrito, California.

== Selected publications ==
- Fáry, István (1948), "On straight-line representation of planar graphs", Acta Sci. Math. (Szeged), 11: 229–233, MR 0026311.
- Fáry, István (1949), "Sur la courbure totale d'une courbe gauche faisant un nœud", Bulletin de la Société Mathématique de France, 77: 128–138, doi:10.24033/bsmf.1405.
