= Michel Balinski =

American and French mathematician

Michel Louis Balinski
- Michał Ludwik Baliński
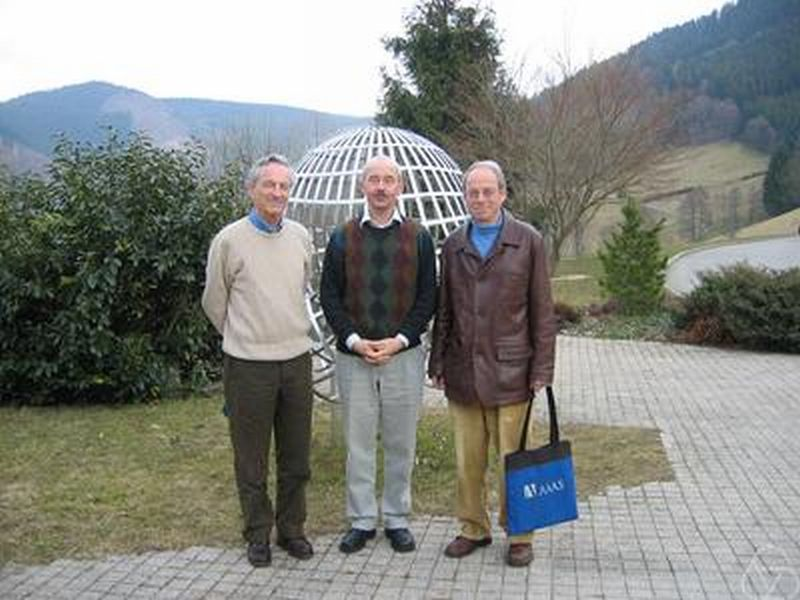
- From left: Michel Balinski, Friedrich Pukelsheim, Steven Brams, Oberwolfach 2004
- Born: October 6, 1933; Geneva, Switzerland
- Died: February 4, 2019 (aged 85); Bayonne, France
- Citizenship: United States, France
- Education: Williams College, Massachusetts Institute of Technology, Princeton University
- Known for: Balinski's theorem
- Children: Marta Balińska b. 1965 - known for the biography of Ludwik Rajchman; Maria Balinska
- Awards: John von Neumann Theory Prize; Lanchester Prize; Lester R. Ford Award
- Scientific career
- Fields: Mathematics, economics, operations research, political science
- Workplaces: École Polytechnique, Massachusetts Institute of Technology, Princeton University, Cornell University
- Doctoral advisor: Albert W. Tucker
- Doctoral students: Louis Billera

Michel Louis Balinski (born Michał Ludwik Baliński; October 6, 1933 – February 4, 2019) was an American and French applied mathematician, economist, operations research analyst and political scientist. Educated in the United States, from 1980 he lived and worked in France. He was known for his work in optimisation (combinatorial, linear, nonlinear), convex polyhedra, stable matching, and the theory and practice of electoral systems, jury decision, and social choice. He was Directeur de Recherche de classe exceptionnelle (emeritus) of the C.N.R.S. at the École Polytechnique (Paris). He was awarded the John von Neumann Theory Prize by INFORMS in 2013.

Michel Louis Balinski died in Bayonne, France. He maintained an active involvement in research and public appearances, his last public engagement took place in January 2019.

== Early life ==
Michel Balinski was born in Geneva, Switzerland, the grandson of the Polish bacteriologist and founder of UNICEF, Ludwik Rajchman. Brought up by his mother Irena (Rajchman) Balinska and his grandparents, they were living in France when the Nazis invaded in 1940. They fled via Spain and Portugal to the United States, on an unauthorised visa signed by Eduardo Propper de Callejón. He graduated from the Edgewood School in Greenwich CT in 1950, earned a B.A. degree cum laude in mathematics at Williams College in 1954 and a M.Sc. in economics at the Massachusetts Institute of Technology in 1956. He completed a Ph.D. in mathematics at Princeton University in 1959 under the supervision of Albert W. Tucker.

== Career ==
After completing his Ph.D. Balinski remained at Princeton University as a research associate then lecturer in mathematics. From 1963 to 1965 he was associate professor of economics at the Wharton School of the University of Pennsylvania. He was then appointed to the Graduate Center of the City University of New York, first as associate professor then (as of 1969) professor of mathematics. One of his doctoral students at the City University was another noted mathematician, Louis Billera, through whom he has many academic descendants. In 1978 he was appointed professor of organization and management and of administrative sciences at Yale University.

In parallel with his academic work, Balinski engaged in consulting as of the time he was a graduate student at Princeton. A participant in the beginnings of what became the consulting firm Mathematica, he was a senior consultant with the firm from 1962 to 1974. He also acted as a consultant elsewhere, including the Rand Corporation, Mobil Oil Research, the Office de Radiodiffusion Télévision Française (Office de Radiodiffusion-Télévision Française), the Mayor's office of the City of New York (as member of the Operations Research Council), and Econ, Inc. From 1975 to 1977 he was chairman of System and Decision Sciences at IIASA (International Institute for Applied Systems Analyses) at Laxenburg, Austria.

In 1980 Balinski settled in France, becoming Directeur de Recherche de classe exceptionnelle of the CNRS (Centre National de Recherche Scientifique) at the Laboratoire d’Econométrie of the Ecole Polytechnique in 1983. Concurrently he was Leading Professor of Applied Mathematics and Statistics and of Economics at Stony Brook University (1983–1990), where he founded and was the first Director of the Institute for Decision Sciences (that has since become the Center for Game Theory in Economics).

Upon becoming director of the Laboratoire d’Econométrie (1989 to 1999), he co-founded and co-directed the joint Ecole Polytechnique/Université de Paris 1 masters program "Modélisation et méthodes mathématiques en économie: optimisation et analyse stratégiques," and its successor the joint Ecole Polytechnique/Université Pierre et Marie Curie (Paris 6) masters program "Optimisation, jeux et modélisation en économie."

He was a visiting professor at other institutions, including the Ecole Polytechnique Fédérale de Lausanne (1972–1973), the Université Scientifique et Médicale de Grenoble (1974–1975), the Universidad de Chile in Santiago (1994), and INSEAD in Fontainebleau (1997–1998).

Balinski was the founding editor-in-chief of the journal Mathematical Programming in 1971, one of the founders of the Mathematical Optimization Society in 1970, and president of that society from 1986 to 1989.

== Research contributions ==
Balinski's Ph.D. thesis concerned the vertex enumeration problem, the algorithmic problem of listing all vertices of a convex polytope or finding all optimal solutions of a linear program, and some of his subsequent work continued to concern polyhedral combinatorics. The thesis includes the fundamental theorem, published in 1961, that the skeletons of polytopes in "n"-space viewed as graphs are "n"-connected, meaning that at least "n" edges must be removed to disconnect the graph of the remaining vertices and edges; it is known as Balinski's theorem. He also proved the Hirsch conjecture for several different classes of polytopes associated with the transportation problem, showed that the diameter of the skeleton of the assignment polytope viewed as a graph is 2, and found the polytope whose vertices are the stable matchings of the university admissions problem.

His contributions to linear and nonlinear optimization include a primal/dual simplex method that incorporates a natural proof of termination and leads to a self-contained, elementary but rigorous, constructive account of the theory and the basic computational tool of linear programming; the use and economic interpretation of dual prices; and a proof that prices in von Neumann's model of an expanding economy are marginal values. His work in integer programming includes the formulation and analysis of the fixed cost transportation problem; one of the first computationally successful practical uses of Gomory's cutting plane algorithm (1968, truck deliveries with cost functions in part concave, in part convex); and an extensive survey paper on integer programming which was awarded INFORM's Lanchester Prize in 1965.

Together with Mourad Baïou, he developed a new formulation of stable matchings and generalizations in terms of graphs, providing a unified notation and tool leading to new proofs of known results and new results; notably, a characterization of the university admissions polytope, and a generalization of matching opposites (e.g., men and women, students and universities) to matching opposites in real numbers (e.g., time spent together).

In 1970, he published one of the earliest papers on the closure problem and its applications to transportation planning.

=== Electoral systems ===
Balinski has made important contributions to the theory of electoral systems, namely, representation and apportionment on the one hand, and voting on the other. His 1982 book with H. Peyton Young has had direct practical application in apportioning the seats of assemblies to regions in several countries (including the UK). He conceived and developed with others "biproportional apportionment" that has been adopted (as of 2014) in five of Switzerland's cantonal elections. His 2010 book with Rida Laraki proposes a new theory and method of voting called "majority judgment" where voters evaluate the merit of each candidate in a well-defined ordinal scale (instead of voting for one or several candidates, or rank-ordering them) and majorities determine society's evaluation of each candidate and thereby its rank-ordering of them all. This, they prove, overcomes the most important drawbacks of the traditional theory of voting (including Arrow's impossibility theorem).

== Awards and honors ==
Phi Beta Kappa, Williams College 1954; Frederick W. Lanchester Prize, INFORMS 1965; I.B.M. World Trade Corporation Fellow 1969–1970; Lester R. Ford Award, Mathematical Association of America 1976; Honorary Master of Arts, Privatum, Yale University 1978; Special Service Award, Mathematical Optimization Society, 1982; Honorary Doctorate (Ehrendoktors, Mathematisch-Naturwissenshaftlichen) Universität Augsburg, 2004; Murat Sertel Lecturer (inaugural lecture), 8th International Meeting of the Society for Social Choice and Welfare, Istanbul, July 2006; Messenger Lecturer, Cornell University, September 2007; IFORS Distinguished Lecturer, INFORMS National Meeting, Washington, D.C., October 2008; George H. Hallet Award, 2009; Lester R. Ford Award, Mathematical Association of America, 2009; Celebration of Michel Balinski's 78 years at the 23rd International Conference on Game Theory, SUNY Stony Brook, July 2012; John von Neumann Theory Prize, INFORMS, 2013; INFORMS Fellow, 2014.

== Selected publications ==
=== Books ===
- Fair Representation: Meeting the Ideal of One Man, One Vote, Michel L. Balinski and H. Peyton Young, Yale University Press, 1982. 2nd edition, Brookings Institution Press, Washington, D.C., 2001. Japanese translation, Chikura-Shobo Publishing Co., Tokyo, 1987. ISBN 9780815716341. [Given the George H. Hallet Award, 2009, "[For] a book published at least 10 years ago that has made a lasting contribution to ... representation and electoral systems."]
- Le Suffrage Universel Inachevé, Michel Balinski, Editions Belin, 2004, ISBN 2-7011-3774-8.
- Majority Judgment: Measuring, Ranking, and Electing, Michel Balinski and Rida Laraki, MIT Press, 2010, ISBN 9780262015134.

=== Articles ===
- Balinski, M. L. (1961), "An algorithm for finding all vertices of convex polyhedral sets", Journal of the Society for Industrial and Applied Mathematics, 9: 72–88, doi:10.1137/0109008, MR 0142057.
- —— (1961), "On the graph structure of convex polyhedra in n-space", Pacific Journal of Mathematics, 11 (2): 431–434, doi:10.2140/pjm.1961.11.431.
- —— (1965), "Integer Programming : Methods, Uses, Computation", Management Science, 12 (3): 253–313, Bibcode:1965ManSc..12..253B, doi:10.1287/mnsc.12.3.253, JSTOR 2627582. Reprinted in Mathematics of the Decision Sciences (1968), in Proceedings of the Princeton Symposium on Mathematical Programming, 1970, and in 50 Years of Integer Programming 1958–2008 (2010). Given the 1965 Lanchester Prize
- ——; Baumol, W. J. (1968). "The dual in nonlinear programming and its economic interpretation". The Review of Economic Studies. 25 (3): 237–256. doi:10.2307/2296660. JSTOR 2296660.
- ——; Tucker, A. W. (1968). "Duality theory of linear programs: a constructive approach with applications". SIAM Review. 11: 247–377.
- —— (1970), "On a selection problem", Management Science, 17 (3): 230–231, doi:10.1287/mnsc.17.3.230.
- ——; Young, H. P. (1974). "Interpreting von Neumann model prices as marginal values". Journal of Economic Theory. 9 (4): 449–463. doi:10.1016/0022-0531(74)90045-3.
- ——; Young, H. P. (1975). "The quota method of apportionment" (PDF). Amer. Math. Monthly. 82 (7): 701–730. doi:10.2307/2318729. JSTOR 2318729.. Given the 1976 Lester R. Ford Award
- —— (1984). "The Hirsch conjecture for dual transportation polyhedra" (PDF). Mathematics of Operations Research. 9 (4): 629–633. doi:10.1287/moor.9.4.629.
- ——; Demange, G. (1989). "An axiomatic approach to proportionality between matrices" (PDF). Mathematics of Operations Research. 14 (4): 700–719. doi:10.1287/moor.14.4.700.
- ——; Ramiréz, V. (1996). "A case study of electoral manipulation: the Mexican laws of 1989 and 1994". Electoral Studies. 15 (2): 203–217. doi:10.1016/0261-3794(95)00033-x.
- ——; Sönmez, T. (1999). "A tale of two mechanisms: student placement". Journal of Economic Theory. 84: 73–94. doi:10.1006/jeth.1998.2469.
- Baïou, M.; Balinski, M. L. (2002). "The stable allocation (or ordinal transportation) problem". Mathematics of Operations Research. 27: 662–680. doi:10.1287/moor.27.4.662.302.
- Balinski, M. L. (2005), "What is just?", American Mathematical Monthly, 112 (6): 502–5011, doi:10.2307/30037520, JSTOR 30037520.
- ——; Laraki, R. (2007). "A theory of measuring, electing and ranking". Proceedings of the National Academy of Sciences. 104 (21): 8720–8725. Bibcode:2007PNAS..104.8720B. doi:10.1073/pnas.0702634104. PMC 1885569. PMID 17496140.
- Balinski, M. L. (2008), "Fair majority voting (or how to eliminate gerrymandering)", American Mathematical Monthly, 115 (2): 97–113, doi:10.1080/00029890.2008.11920503, JSTOR 27642416, S2CID 1139441.Given the Lester R. Ford Award
- —— (2009), "Projets électoraux: le droit rencontre les mathématiques", Recueil Dalloz, 3: 183–186.
- ——; Laraki, R. (2014). "Judge: Don't Vote". Operations Research. 62 (3): 483–511. doi:10.1287/opre.2014.1269.
