= Laplacian smoothing =

Algorithm to smooth a polygonal mesh

Laplacian smoothing is an algorithm to smooth a polygonal mesh. For each vertex in a mesh, a new position is chosen based on local information (such as the position of neighbours) and the vertex is moved there. In the case that a mesh is topologically a rectangular grid (that is, each internal vertex is connected to four neighbours) then this operation produces the Laplacian of the mesh.

More formally, the smoothing operation may be described per-vertex as:

$$\bar{x}_{i}= \frac{1}{N} \sum_{j=1}^{N}\bar{x}_j$$

Where $N$ is the number of adjacent vertices to node $i$, $\bar{x}_{j}$ is the position of the $j$-th adjacent vertex and $\bar{x}_{i}$ is the new position for node $i$.

== See also ==
- Tutte embedding, an embedding of a planar mesh in which each vertex is already at the average of its neighbours' positions
