= Asteroidal triple-free graph =

In graph theory, an asteroidal triple-free graph or AT-free graph is a graph that contains no asteroidal triple.

== Definition ==
A graph with an asteroidal triple, the set of vertices $\{x, y, z\}$. The graph is therefore not AT-free.

An asteroidal triple is an independent set of three vertices ${x, y, z}$ such that each pair is joined by a path that avoids the neighborhood of the third vertex. More formally, in a graph $G$, three vertices $x$, $y$, and $z$ form an asteroidal triple if:

- $x, y$, and $z$ are pairwise non-adjacent
- There exists an $x,y$-path that avoids $N(z)$ (the neighborhood of $z$)
- There exists an $x,z$-path that avoids $N(y)$
- There exists a $y,z$-path that avoids $N(x)$

A graph is AT-free if it contains no asteroidal triples.

== Relationship to other graph classes ==
A cocomparability graph, which is AT-free

AT-free graphs provide a common generalization of several important graph classes:

- Interval graphs are precisely the graphs that are both chordal and AT-free.
- Permutation graphs are AT-free.
- Trapezoid graphs are AT-free.
- Cocomparability graphs are AT-free.

The class hierarchy is: $\text{interval}\cap\text{comparability} \subset \text{permutation} \subset \text{trapezoid} \subset \text{cocomparability} \subset \text{AT-free}$.

== Structural properties ==
=== Characterizations ===
AT-free graphs can be characterized in multiple ways:

- Via minimal triangulations: A graph $G$ is AT-free if and only if every minimal triangulation $T(G)$ of $G$ (i.e., every minimal chordal completion) is an interval graph. Additionally, a claw-free AT-free graph is characterized by the property that all of its minimal chordal completions are proper interval graphs.
- Via unrelated vertices: A graph $G$ is AT-free if and only if for every vertex $x$ of $G$, no component of the non-neighborhood of $x$ contains vertices that are unrelated with respect to $x$.
- Via dominating pairs and the spine property.

=== Dominating pairs ===
Every connected AT-free graph contains a dominating pair, a pair of vertices $(u,v)$ such that every path joining them is a dominating set in the graph.

Furthermore, some dominating pair achieves the diameter of the graph. Every connected AT-free graph has a path-mccds (minimum cardinality connected dominating set that induces a path). In AT-free graphs with diameter at least 4, the vertices that can be in dominating pairs are restricted to two disjoint sets $X$ and $Y$, where $(x,y)$ is a dominating pair if and only if $x \in X$ and $y \in Y$.

=== Spine property ===
A graph $G$ is AT-free if and only if every connected induced subgraph $H$ satisfies the spine property: for every nonadjacent dominating pair $(\alpha,\beta)$ in $H$, there exists a neighbor $\alpha'$ of $\alpha$ such that $(\alpha',\beta)$ is a dominating pair in the component of $H-{\alpha}$ containing $\beta$.

=== Decomposition ===
AT-free graphs admit a decomposition scheme through pokable dominating pairs. A vertex $v$ is pokable if adding a pendant vertex adjacent to $v$ preserves the AT-free property. Every connected AT-free graph contains a pokable dominating pair, and contracting certain equivalence classes of vertices (based on their domination properties) yields another AT-free graph with a pokable dominating pair. This process can be repeated until the graph is reduced to a single vertex.

== Algorithmic properties ==
AT-free graphs can be recognized in $O(n^3)$ time for an $n$-vertex graph.

For AT-free graphs, the pathwidth equals the treewidth.

The strong perfect graph theorem holds for AT-free graphs, as they are a subclass of perfect graphs.

== Applications ==
The linear structure apparent in AT-free graphs and their subclasses has led to efficient algorithms for various problems on these graphs, exploiting their dominating pair structure and other properties.

== See also ==
- Interval graph
- Chordal graph
- Chordal completion
- Cocomparability graph
- Perfect graph
