= Semiorder =

Numerical ordering with a margin of error

The Hasse diagram of a semiorder. Two items are comparable when their vertical coordinates differ by at least one unit (the spacing between solid blue lines).

In order theory, a branch of mathematics, a semiorder is a type of ordering for items with numerical scores, where items with widely differing scores are compared by their scores and where scores within a given margin of error are deemed incomparable. Semiorders were introduced and applied in mathematical psychology by Duncan Luce (1956) as a model of human preference. They generalize strict weak orderings, in which items with equal scores may be tied but there is no margin of error. They are a special case of partial orders and of interval orders, and can be characterized among the partial orders by additional axioms, or by two forbidden four-item suborders.

== Utility theory ==
The original motivation for introducing semiorders was to model human preferences without assuming that incomparability is a transitive relation. For instance, suppose that $x$, $y$, and $z$ represent three quantities of the same material, and that $x$ is larger than $z$ by the smallest amount that is perceptible as a difference, while $y$ is halfway between the two of them. Then, a person who desires more of the material would prefer $x$ to $z$, but would not have a preference between the other two pairs. In this example, $x$ and $y$ are incomparable in the preference ordering, as are $y$ and $z$, but $x$ and $z$ are comparable, so incomparability does not obey the transitive law.

To model this mathematically, suppose that objects are given numerical utility values, by letting $u$ be any utility function that maps the objects to be compared (a set $X$) to real numbers. Set a numerical threshold (which may be normalized to 1) such that utilities within that threshold of each other are declared incomparable, and define a binary relation $<$ on the objects, by setting $x<y$ whenever $u(x)\le u(y)-1$. Then $(X,<)$ forms a semiorder. If, instead, objects are declared comparable whenever their utilities differ, the result would be a strict weak ordering, for which incomparability of objects (based on equality of numbers) would be transitive.

== Axiomatics ==
Forbidden: two mutually incomparable two-point linear orders

Forbidden: three linearly ordered points and a fourth incomparable point

A semiorder, defined from a utility function as above, is a partially ordered set with the following two properties:

- Whenever two disjoint pairs of elements are comparable, for instance as $w<x$ and $y<z$, there must be an additional comparison among these elements, because $u(w)\le u(y)$ would imply $w<z$ while $u(w)\ge u(y)$ would imply $y<x$. Therefore, it is impossible to have two mutually incomparable two-point linear orders.
- If three elements form a linear ordering $w<x<y$, then every fourth point $z$ must be comparable to at least one of them, because $u(z)\le u(x)$ would imply $z<y$ while $u(z)\ge u(x)$ would imply $w<z$, in either case showing that $z$ is comparable to $w$ or to $y$. So it is impossible to have a three-point linear order with a fourth incomparable point.

Conversely, every finite partial order that avoids the two forbidden four-point orderings described above can be given utility values making it into a semiorder. Therefore, rather than being a consequence of a definition in terms of utility, these forbidden orderings, or equivalent systems of axioms, can be taken as a combinatorial definition of semiorders. If a semiorder on $n$ elements is given only in terms of the order relation between its pairs of elements, obeying these axioms, then it is possible to construct a utility function that represents the order in time $O(n^2)$, where the $O$ is an instance of big O notation.

For orderings on infinite sets of elements, the orderings that can be defined by utility functions and the orderings that can be defined by forbidden four-point orders differ from each other. For instance, if a semiorder $(X,<)$ (as defined by forbidden orders) includes an uncountable totally ordered subset then there do not exist sufficiently many sufficiently well-spaced real-numbers for it to be representable by a utility function. Fishburn (1973) supplies a precise characterization of the semiorders that may be defined numerically.

== Relation to other kinds of order ==
=== Partial orders ===
One may define a partial order $(X,\le)$ from a semiorder $(X,<)$ by declaring that $x\le y$ whenever either $x<y$ or $x=y$. Of the axioms that a partial order is required to obey, reflexivity ($x\le x$) follows automatically from this definition. Antisymmetry (if $x\le y$ and $y\le x$ then $x=y$) follows from the first semiorder axiom. Transitivity (if $x\le y$ and $y\le z$ then $x\le z$) follows from the second semiorder axiom. Therefore, the binary relation $(X,\le)$ defined in this way meets the three requirements of a partial order that it be reflexive, antisymmetric, and transitive.

Conversely, suppose that $(X,\le)$ is a partial order that has been constructed in this way from a semiorder. Then the semiorder may be recovered by declaring that $x<y$ whenever $x\le y$ and $x\ne y$. Not every partial order leads to a semiorder in this way, however: The first of the semiorder axioms listed above follows automatically from the axioms defining a partial order, but the others do not. A partial order that includes four elements forming two two-element chains would lead to a relation $(X,<)$ that violates the second semiorder axiom, and a partial order that includes four elements forming a three-element chain and an unrelated item would violate the third semiorder axiom (cf. pictures in section #Axiomatics).

=== Weak orders ===
Every strict weak ordering < is also a semi-order. More particularly, transitivity of < and transitivity of incomparability with respect to < together imply the above axiom 2, while transitivity of incomparability alone implies axiom 3. The semiorder shown in the top image is not a strict weak ordering, since the rightmost vertex is incomparable to its two closest left neighbors, but they are comparable.

=== Interval orders ===
The semiorder defined from a utility function $u$ may equivalently be defined as the interval order defined by the intervals $[u(x),u(x)+1]$, so every semiorder is an example of an interval order. A relation is a semiorder if, and only if, it can be obtained as an interval order of unit length intervals $(\ell _{i},\ell _{i}+1)$.

=== Quasitransitive relations ===
According to Amartya K. Sen, semi-orders were examined by Dean T. Jamison and Lawrence J. Lau and found to be a special case of quasitransitive relations. In fact, every semiorder is quasitransitive, and quasitransitivity is invariant to adding all pairs of incomparable items. Removing all non-vertical red lines from the topmost image results in a Hasse diagram for a relation that is still quasitransitive, but violates both axiom 2 and 3; this relation might no longer be useful as a preference ordering.

== Combinatorial enumeration ==
The number of distinct semiorders on $n$ unlabeled items is given by the Catalan numbers
$$\frac{1}{n+1}\binom{2n}{n},$$
while the number of semiorders on $n$ labeled items is given by the sequence

1, 1, 3, 19, 183, 2371, 38703, 763099, 17648823, ... (sequence A006531 in the OEIS)

== Other results ==
Any finite semiorder has order dimension at most three.

Among all partial orders with a fixed number of elements and a fixed number of comparable pairs, the partial orders that have the largest number of linear extensions are semiorders.

Semiorders are known to obey the 1/3–2/3 conjecture: in any finite semiorder that is not a total order, there exists a pair of elements $x$ and $y$ such that $x$ appears earlier than $y$ in between 1/3 and 2/3 of the linear extensions of the semiorder.

The set of semiorders on an $n$-element set is well-graded: if two semiorders on the same set differ from each other by the addition or removal of $k$ order relations, then it is possible to find a path of $k$ steps from the first semiorder to the second one, in such a way that each step of the path adds or removes a single order relation and each intermediate state in the path is itself a semiorder.

The incomparability graphs of semiorders are called indifference graphs, and are a special case of the interval graphs.
