= Trenk =

Trenk is a surname. Notable people with this name include:

- Ann Trenk, American mathematician
- Franjo Trenk (1711–1749), Austrian soldier and nobleman
- Hans Trenk, German commander of World War I submarine SM UB-86
- Henric Trenk (1818–1892), Swiss-born Romanian artist
- Lieut. Trenk (died 1913), German airship officer, victim of the Johannisthal air disaster
- Willy Trenk-Trebitsch (1902–1983), Austrian actor
