= Sergey Kislitsyn =

Russian mathematician

Sergey S. Kislitsyn, (Russian: Серге́й Серге́евич Кисли́цын) is a Russian mathematician, specializing in combinatorics and coding theory.

Kislitsyn was born January 5, 1935, in Ivanovo, Soviet Union. He received his M.S. in mathematics from Leningrad State University in 1957. From 1962 until 1970 he worked at Yekaterinburg branch of the Steklov Institute of Mathematics (Krasovsky Institute of Mathematics and Mechanics). He defended his Ph.D. thesis in 1964 and continued working as a lecturer at Krasnoyarsk State University.

Kislitsyn is known for posing the 1/3–2/3 conjecture for linear extensions of finite posets, which he published in 1968. The conjecture is established in several special cases but open in full generality.
