= Intersection graph =

Graph representing intersections between given sets

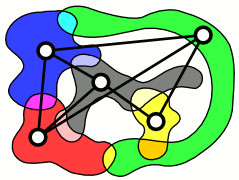
An example of how intersecting sets define a graph.

In graph theory, an intersection graph is a graph that represents the pattern of intersections of a family of sets. Any graph can be represented as an intersection graph, but some important special classes of graphs can be defined by the types of sets that are used to form an intersection representation of them.

== Formal definition ==
Formally, an intersection graph G is an undirected graph formed from a family of sets

$$S_i, \,\,\, i = 0, 1, 2, \dots$$

by creating one vertex v_{i} for each set S_{i}, and connecting two vertices v_{i} and v_{j} by an edge whenever the corresponding two sets have a nonempty intersection, that is,

$$E(G) = \{ \{ v_i, v_j \} \mid i \neq j, S_i \cap S_j \neq \empty \}.$$

== All graphs are intersection graphs ==
Any undirected graph G may be represented as an intersection graph. For each vertex v_{i} of G, form a set S_{i} consisting of the edges incident to v_{i}; then two such sets have a nonempty intersection if and only if the corresponding vertices share an edge. Therefore, G is the intersection graph of the sets S_{i}.

Erdős, Goodman & Pósa (1966) provide a construction that is more efficient, in the sense that it requires a smaller total number of elements in all of the sets S_{i} combined. For it, the total number of set elements is at most n^{2}/4, where n is the number of vertices in the graph. They credit the observation that all graphs are intersection graphs to Szpilrajn-Marczewski (1945), but say to see also Čulík (1964). The intersection number of a graph is the minimum total number of elements in any intersection representation of the graph.

== Classes of intersection graphs ==
Many important graph families can be described as intersection graphs of more restricted types of set families, for instance sets derived from some kind of geometric configuration:

- An interval graph is defined as the intersection graph of intervals on the real line, or of connected subgraphs of a path graph.
- An indifference graph may be defined as the intersection graph of unit intervals on the real line
- A circular arc graph is defined as the intersection graph of arcs on a circle.
- A polygon-circle graph is defined as the intersection of polygons with corners on a circle.
- One characterization of a chordal graph is as the intersection graph of connected subgraphs of a tree.
- A trapezoid graph is defined as the intersection graph of trapezoids formed from two parallel lines. They are a generalization of the notion of permutation graph, in turn they are a special case of the family of the complements of comparability graphs known as cocomparability graphs.
- A unit disk graph is defined as the intersection graph of unit disks in the plane.
- A circle graph is the intersection graph of a set of chords of a circle.
- The circle packing theorem states that planar graphs are exactly the intersection graphs of families of closed disks in the plane bounded by non-crossing circles.
- Scheinerman's conjecture (now a theorem) states that every planar graph can also be represented as an intersection graph of line segments in the plane. However, intersection graphs of line segments may be nonplanar as well, and recognizing intersection graphs of line segments is complete for the existential theory of the reals (Schaefer 2010).
- The line graph of a graph G is defined as the intersection graph of the edges of G, where we represent each edge as the set of its two endpoints.
- A string graph is the intersection graph of curves on a plane.
- A graph has boxicity k if it is the intersection graph of multidimensional boxes of dimension k, but not of any smaller dimension.
- A clique graph is the intersection graph of maximal cliques of another graph
- A block graph or clique tree is the intersection graph of biconnected components of another graph

Scheinerman (1985) characterized the intersection classes of graphs, families of finite graphs that can be described as the intersection graphs of sets drawn from a given family of sets. It is necessary and sufficient that the family have the following properties:

- Every induced subgraph of a graph in the family must also be in the family.
- Every graph formed from a graph in the family by replacing a vertex by a clique must also belong to the family.
- There exists an infinite sequence of graphs in the family, each of which is an induced subgraph of the next graph in the sequence, with the property that every graph in the family is an induced subgraph of a graph in the sequence.

If the intersection graph representations have the additional requirement that different vertices must be represented by different sets, then the clique expansion property can be omitted.

== Related concepts ==
An order-theoretic analog to the intersection graphs are the inclusion orders. In the same way that an intersection representation of a graph labels every vertex with a set so that vertices are adjacent if and only if their sets have nonempty intersection, so an inclusion representation f of a poset labels every element with a set so that for any x and y in the poset, x ≤ y if and only if f(x) ⊆ f(y).

== See also ==
- Contact graph
