= Computers and Intractability =

1979 classic textbook on computational complexity theory

Computers and Intractability: A Guide to the Theory of NP-Completeness
- Author: Michael R. Garey and David S. Johnson
- Language: English
- Series: A Series of Books in the Mathematical Sciences
- Subject: Computer science
- Genre: Textbook
- Publisher: W. H. Freeman and Company
- Publication date: 1979
- Publication place: United States
- Media type: Print
- Pages: x+338
- ISBN: 0-7167-1045-5
- OCLC: 247570676
- Dewey Decimal: 519.4
- LC Class: QA76.6 .G35

Computers and Intractability: A Guide to the Theory of NP-Completeness is a textbook by Michael Garey and David S. Johnson. It was the first book exclusively on the theory of NP-completeness and computational intractability. The book features an appendix providing a thorough compendium of NP-complete problems (which was updated in later printings of the book). The book is now outdated in some respects as it does not cover more recent development such as the PCP theorem. It is nevertheless still in print and is regarded as a classic: in a 2006 study, the CiteSeer search engine listed the book as the most cited reference in computer science literature.

== Open problems ==
Another appendix of the book featured problems for which it was not known whether they were NP-complete or in P (or neither). The problems (with their original names) are:

1. Graph isomorphism
  This problem is known to be in NP, but it is unknown if it is NP-complete.
2. Subgraph homeomorphism (for a fixed graph H)
3. Graph genus
4. Chordal graph completion
5. Chromatic index
6. Spanning tree parity problem
7. Partial order dimension
8. Precedence constrained 3-processor scheduling
  This problem was still open as of 2016.
9. Linear programming
10. Total unimodularity
11. Composite number
  Testing for compositeness is known to be in P, but the complexity of the closely related integer factorization problem remains open.
12. Minimum length triangulation
  Problem 12 is known to be NP-hard, but it is unknown if it is in NP.

== Reception ==
Soon after it appeared, the book received positive reviews by reputed researchers in the area of theoretical computer science.

In his review, Ronald V. Book recommends the book to "anyone who wishes to learn about the subject of NP-completeness", and he explicitly mentions the "extremely useful" appendix with over 300 NP-hard computational problems. He concludes: "Computer science needs more books like this one."

Harry R. Lewis praises the mathematical prose of the authors: "Garey and Johnson's book is a thorough, clear, and practical exposition of NP-completeness. In many respects it is hard to imagine a better treatment of the subject." Also, he considers the appendix as "unique" and "as a starting point in attempts to show new problems to be NP-complete".

Twenty-three years after the book appeared, Lance Fortnow, editor-in-chief of the scientific journal Transactions on Computational Theory, states: "I consider Garey and Johnson the single most important book on my office bookshelf. Every computer scientist should have this book on their shelves as well. [...] Garey and Johnson has the best introduction to computational complexity I have ever seen."

== See also ==
- List of NP-complete problems
