= David S. Johnson =

American computer scientist

- Born: David Stifler Johnson; December 9, 1945; Washington, D.C.
- Died: March 8, 2016 (aged 70)
- Education: Amherst College; MIT
- Known for: Computers and Intractability
- Awards: ACM Fellow (1995); Knuth Prize (2010)
- Scientific career
- Fields: Computer science
- Thesis: Near-Optimal Bin Packing Algorithms (1973)

David Stifler Johnson (December 9, 1945 – March 8, 2016) was an American computer scientist specializing in algorithms and optimization. He was the head of the Algorithms and Optimization Department of AT&T Labs Research from 1988 to 2013, and was a visiting professor at Columbia University from 2014 to 2016. He was awarded the 2010 Knuth Prize.

Johnson was born in 1945 in Washington, D.C. He graduated summa cum laude from Amherst College in 1967, then earned his S.M. from MIT in 1968 and his Ph.D. from MIT in 1973. All three of his degrees are in mathematics. He was inducted as a Fellow of the Association for Computing Machinery in 1995, and as a member of the National Academy of Engineering in 2016.

He was the coauthor of Computers and Intractability: A Guide to the Theory of NP-Completeness (ISBN 0-7167-1045-5) along with Michael Garey. As of March 9, 2016, his publications have been cited over 96,000 times, and he has an h-index of 78. Johnson died on March 8, 2016, at the age of 70.

== See also ==
- NP-completeness
- List of computer scientists
