= Circular-arc graph =

Intersection graph for a set of arcs on a circle

A circular-arc graph (left) and a corresponding arc model (right).

In graph theory, a circular-arc graph is the intersection graph of a set of arcs on the circle. It has one vertex for each arc in the set, and an edge between every pair of vertices corresponding to arcs that intersect.

Formally, let

$$I_1, I_2, \ldots, I_n \subset C_1$$

be a set of arcs. Then the corresponding circular-arc graph is G = (V, E) where

$$V = \{I_1, I_2, \ldots, I_n\}$$

and

$$\{I_\alpha, I_\beta\} \in E \iff  I_\alpha \cap I_\beta \neq \varnothing.$$

A family of arcs that corresponds to G is called an arc model.

== Recognition ==
Tucker (1980) demonstrated the first polynomial recognition algorithm for circular-arc graphs, which runs in ${\mathcal O}(n^3)$ time. McConnell (2003) gave the first linear $({\mathcal O}(n+m))$ time recognition algorithm, where $m$ is the number of edges. More recently, Kaplan and Nussbaum developed a simpler linear time recognition algorithm.

== Relation to other graph classes ==
Circular-arc graphs are a natural generalization of interval graphs. If a circular-arc graph G has an arc model that leaves some point of the circle uncovered, the circle can be cut at that point and stretched to a line, which results in an interval representation. Unlike interval graphs, however, circular-arc graphs are not always perfect, as the odd chordless cycles C_{5}, C_{7}, etc., are circular-arc graphs.

== Some subclasses ==
In the following, let $G = (V,E)$ be an arbitrary graph.

=== Unit circular-arc graphs ===
$G$ is a unit circular-arc graph if there exists a corresponding arc model such that each arc is of equal length.

The number of labelled unit circular-arc graphs on n vertices is given by $(n+2)\binom{2n-1}{n-1}-2^{2n-1}$.

=== Proper circular-arc graphs ===
$G$ is a proper circular-arc graph (also known as a circular interval graph) if there exists a corresponding arc model such that no arc properly contains another. Recognizing these graphs and constructing a proper arc model can both be performed in linear $({\mathcal O}(n + m))$ time. They form one of the fundamental subclasses of the claw-free graphs.

=== Helly circular-arc graphs ===
$G$ is a Helly circular-arc graph if there exists a corresponding arc model such that the arcs constitute a Helly family. Gavril (1974) gives a characterization of this class that implies an ${\mathcal O(n^3)}$ recognition algorithm.

Joeris et al. (2009) give other characterizations of this class, which imply a recognition algorithm that runs in O(n+m) time when the input is a graph. If the input graph is not a Helly circular-arc graph, then the algorithm returns a certificate of this fact in the form of a forbidden induced subgraph. They also gave an O(n) time algorithm for determining whether a given circular-arc model has the Helly property.

== Applications ==
Circular-arc graphs are useful in modeling periodic resource allocation problems in operations research. Each interval represents a request for a resource for a specific period repeated in time.
