= Michael Garey =

American computer scientist

- Born: Michael Randolph Garey; November 19, 1945 (age 80); Manitowoc, Wisconsin, U.S.
- Education: University of Wisconsin–Madison
- Scientific career
- Fields: Computer science

Michael Randolph Garey (born November 19, 1945) is a computer science researcher, and co-author (with David S. Johnson) of Computers and Intractability: A Guide to the Theory of NP-completeness. He and Johnson received the 1979 Frederick W. Lanchester Prize from the Operations Research Society of America for the book. Garey earned his PhD in computer science in 1970 from the University of Wisconsin–Madison. He was employed by AT&T Bell Laboratories in the Mathematical Sciences Research Center from 1970 until his retirement in 1999. For his last 11 years with the organization, he served as its director. His technical specialties included discrete algorithms and computational complexity, approximation algorithms, scheduling theory, and graph theory. From 1978 until 1981 he served as Editor-in-Chief of the Journal of the Association for Computing Machinery. In 1995, Garey was inducted as a Fellow of the Association for Computing Machinery.
