= Leaf power =

Graph representing leaves of a given tree graph

A tree (top) and its corresponding 3-leaf power (bottom)

In the mathematical area of graph theory, a k-leaf power of a tree T is a graph G whose vertices are the leaves of T and whose edges connect pairs of leaves whose distance in T is at most k. That is, G is an induced subgraph of the graph power $T^k$, induced by the leaves of T. For a graph G constructed in this way, T is called a k-leaf root of G.

A graph is a leaf power if it is a k-leaf power for some k. These graphs have applications in phylogeny, the problem of reconstructing evolutionary trees.

== Related classes of graphs ==
Since powers of strongly chordal graphs are strongly chordal and trees are strongly chordal, it follows that leaf powers are strongly chordal graphs. Actually, leaf powers form a proper subclass of strongly chordal graphs; a graph is a leaf power if and only if it is a fixed tolerance NeST graph and such graphs are a proper subclass of strongly chordal graphs.

In Brandstädt et al. (2010) it is shown that interval graphs and the larger class of rooted directed path graphs are leaf powers. The indifference graphs are exactly the leaf powers whose underlying trees are caterpillar trees.

The k-leaf powers for bounded values of k have bounded clique-width, but this is not true of leaf powers with unbounded exponents.

== Structure and recognition ==
A graph is a 3-leaf power if and only if it is a (bull, dart, gem)-free chordal graph. Based on this characterization and similar ones, 3-leaf powers can be recognized in linear time.

Characterizations of 4-leaf powers are given by Rautenbach (2006) and Brandstädt, Le & Sritharan (2008), which also enable linear time recognition. Recognition of the 5-leaf and 6-leaf power graphs are also solved in linear time by Chang and Ko (2007) and Ducoffe (2018), respectively.

For k ≥ 7 the recognition problem of k-leaf powers was unsolved for a long time, but Lafond (2021) showed that k-leaf powers can be recognized in polynomial time for any fixed k. However, the high dependency on the parameter k makes this algorithm unsuitable for practical use.

Also, it has been proved that recognizing k-leaf powers is fixed-parameter tractable when parameterized by k and the degeneracy of the input graph.
