= Ann Trenk =

American mathematician

Ann Natalie Trenk is an American mathematician interested in graph theory and the theory of partially ordered sets, and known for her research on proper distinguishing colorings of graphs and on tolerance graphs. She is the Lewis Atterbury Stimson Professor of Mathematics at Wellesley College.

== Education and career ==
Trenk graduated from Harvard University in 1985 and became a high school mathematics teacher. She began graduate study at Johns Hopkins University in 1987, earned a master of science in education in 1989, and completed a Ph.D. in 1991. Her dissertation, Generalized Perfect Graphs, was supervised by Ed Scheinerman.

After postdoctoral research at Dartmouth College and the University of Massachusetts Amherst, she joined the Wellesley faculty in 1992. At Wellesley, she won the Pinanski Teaching Prize in 1995, became a full professor in 2005, and served as department chair from 2014 to 2016.

== Book ==
With Martin Charles Golumbic, Trenk is the author of the book Tolerance Graphs (Cambridge Studies in Advanced Mathematics 89, Cambridge University Press, 2004).

== Family ==
Trenk is the daughter of New York City attorney Joseph Trenk, and is married to Babson College mathematics Professor Richard Cleary.
