= Diameter (disambiguation) =

A diameter is a line segment passing through the center of a circle or sphere with both its endpoints on the circle or sphere. It is the longest distance between two points of the circle or sphere; more generally the diameter of a set is the longest distance between two of its points.

Other topics related to the diameter of circles and sets include:

- Angular diameter, how large a circle or sphere appears in a field of view
- Diameter (computational geometry), the problem of computing the longest distance between two of $n$ given points or of the points in a polygon
- Diameter (graph theory), the longest distance between two vertices of a graph
- Diameter (group theory), the maximum diameter of a Cayley graph of the group
- Equivalent diameter, the diameter of a circle or sphere with the same area, perimeter, or volume as another object
- Hydraulic diameter, the equivalent diameter of a tube or channel for fluids
- Kinetic diameter, a measure of particles in a gas related to the mean free path
- Kinetic diameter (data), the algorithmic problem of keeping track of the diameter of a moving point set
- Link diameter of a polygon, the number of segments needed to connect each two points in the polygon by a polygonal chain that stays inside the polygon
- List of gear nomenclature#Inside diameter, a measurement of the size of a gear
- Sauter mean diameter, the equivalent diameter of a particle
- Screw thread#Diameters, several measurements of a threaded screw or bolt
- Semidiameter, half of the diameter of a circle or sphere

Diameter may also refer to:

- Diameter (protocol), a computer communication protocol for authentication, authorization, and accounting

== See also ==
- Demeter (disambiguation)
