= Wong graph =

Undirected graph with 30 vertices and 75 edges

- Named after: Pak-Ken Wong
- Vertices: 30
- Edges: 75
- Radius: 3
- Diameter: 3
- Girth: 5
- Automorphisms: 96
- Chromatic number: 4
- Chromatic index: 5
- Properties: Cage

In the mathematical field of graph theory, the Wong graph is a 5-regular undirected graph with 30 vertices and 75 edges. It is one of the four (5,5)-cage graphs, the others being the Foster cage, the Meringer graph, and the Robertson–Wegner graph.

Like the unrelated Harries–Wong graph, it is named after Pak-Ken Wong.

It has chromatic number 4, diameter 3, and is 5-vertex-connected.

== Algebraic properties ==
The characteristic polynomial of the Wong graph is

$$(x-5)(x+1)^2(x^2-5)^3(x-1)^5(x^2+x-5)^8.$$
