= Foster cage =

- Named after: Ronald Martin Foster
- Vertices: 30
- Edges: 75
- Radius: 3
- Diameter: 3
- Girth: 5
- Automorphisms: 30
- Chromatic number: 4
- Chromatic index: 5
- Properties: Cage

In the mathematical field of graph theory, the Foster cage is a 5-regular undirected graph with 30 vertices and 75 edges. It is one of the four (5,5)-cage graphs, the others being the Meringer graph, the Robertson–Wegner graph, and the Wong graph.

Like the unrelated Foster graph, it is named after R. M. Foster.

It has chromatic number 4, diameter 3, and is 5-vertex-connected.

== Algebraic properties ==
The characteristic polynomial of the Foster cage is

$$(x-5)(x+1)(x^2-5)^2(x^2+2x-4)^2(x-2)^4(x^4+2x^3-6x^2-7x+11)^4.$$
