= Meringer graph =

Graph with 30 vertices and 75 edges

- Named after: Markus Meringer
- Vertices: 30
- Edges: 75
- Radius: 3
- Diameter: 3
- Girth: 5
- Automorphisms: 96
- Chromatic number: 3
- Chromatic index: 5
- Properties: Cage

In the mathematical field of graph theory, the Meringer graph is a 5-regular undirected graph with 30 vertices and 75 edges named after Markus Meringer.

It is one of the four (5,5)-cage graphs, the others being the Foster cage, the Robertson–Wegner graph, and the Wong graph.

It has chromatic number 3, diameter 3, and is 5-vertex-connected.

== Algebraic properties ==
The characteristic polynomial of the Meringer graph is

$$(x-5) (x-2)^9 x (x+2)^3 (x+3)^2 (x^2+x-4)^3 (x^2+2x-2)^4.$$
