= Robertson–Wegner graph =

5-regular undirected graph with 30 vertices and 75 edges

- Named after: Neil Robertson
- Vertices: 30
- Edges: 75
- Radius: 3
- Diameter: 3
- Girth: 5
- Automorphisms: 20
- Chromatic number: 4
- Chromatic index: 5
- Properties: Cage

In the mathematical field of graph theory, the Robertson–Wegner graph is a 5-regular undirected graph with 30 vertices and 75 edges named after Neil Robertson and Gerd Wegner.

It is one of the four (5,5)-cage graphs, the others being the Foster cage, the Meringer graph, and the Wong graph.

It has chromatic number 4, diameter 3, and is 5-vertex-connected.

== Algebraic properties ==
The characteristic polynomial of the Robertson–Wegner graph is

$$(x-5) (x-2)^8 (x+1) (x+3)^4(x^4+2x^3-4x^2-5x+5)^2 (x^4+2x^3-6x^2-7x+11)^2.$$
