= Mirka Miller =

Czech-Australian mathematician and computer scientist

- Born: Mirka Koutová; 9 May 1949; Rumburk, Czechoslovakia
- Died: 2 January 2016 (aged 66)
- Education: University of Sydney; University of New England; University of New South Wales
- Scientific career
- Workplaces: University of Newcastle; University of Ballarat; University of West Bohemia
- Thesis: Security of Statistical Databases
- Doctoral advisor: Jennifer Seberry

Mirka Miller (née Koutova, 9 May 1949 – 2 January 2016) was a Czech-Australian mathematician and computer scientist interested in graph theory and data security. She was a professor of electrical engineering and computer science at the University of Newcastle.

== Life ==
Miller was born on 9 May 1949 in Rumburk, then part of Czechoslovakia, as the oldest in a family of five children. After attempting to escape Czechoslovakia in 1968, stopped because of her companion's illness, she became a student at Charles University before successfully escaping in 1969 and becoming a refugee in Australia. Miller earned a bachelor's degree from the University of Sydney in 1976, both in mathematics and computer science, and as a student also played volleyball for the New South Wales team and then the Australia women's national volleyball team. She married ornithologist Ben Miller, became a computer programmer working with the Sydney Morning Herald and for NSW Parks and Wildlife on Lord Howe Island, and began raising a son with Miller.

She separated from her husband and returned to graduate study, earning two master's degrees from the University of New England in 1983 and 1986; her mentors in these degrees were Ernie Bowen and Ivan Friš. She completed a PhD from the University of New South Wales in 1990. Her dissertation, Security of Statistical Databases, was supervised by Jennifer Seberry.

She held academic positions at the University of New England from 1982 to 1991, but after marrying graph theorist Joe Ryan they both moved to the University of Newcastle. She was a faculty member at the University of Newcastle from 1992 to 2004, when she temporarily moved to the University of Ballarat, and returned to Newcastle as a research professor from 2008 until her retirement. At Newcastle, she spent many years as the only woman in the Faculty of Engineering. She retired as a professor emeritus in 2014. She also held a position at the University of West Bohemia as Conjoint Professor since 2001.

She died of gastroesophageal cancer on 2 January 2016. A special issue of the Australasian Journal of Combinatorics was published in her honour in 2017, and special issues of the European Journal of Combinatorics and Journal of Discrete Algorithms followed in 2018.

== Contributions ==
Miller was the author of two books on magic graphs, Super Edge-Antimagic Graphs: A Wealth of Problems and Some Solutions (with Martin Bača, BrownWalker Press, 2008), and (posthumously) Magic and Antimagic Graphs: Attributes, Observations and Challenges in Graph Labelings (with Bača, Joe Ryan, and Andrea Semaničová-Feňovčíková, Springer, 2019).

She wrote over 200 research publications, including a widely cited survey of the degree diameter problem, supervised 20 doctoral students before her death, was the supervisor of six more at the time of her death, and helped found four workshop series on algorithms, graph theory, and networks. She was also influential in the history of graph theory in Indonesia, where she visited twice and supervised six doctoral students.

An infinite family of vertex-transitive graphs with diameter two and a large number of vertices relative to their degree and diameter, the McKay–Miller–Širáň graphs, are named after Miller and her co-authors Brendan McKay and Jozef Širáň, who first constructed them in 1998. They include the Hoffman–Singleton graph as a special case.
