= Table of the largest known graphs of a given diameter and maximal degree =

In graph theory, the degree diameter problem is the problem of finding the largest possible graph for a given maximum degree and diameter. The Moore bound sets limits on this, but for many years mathematicians in the field have been interested in a more precise answer. The table below gives current progress on this problem (excluding the case of degree 2, where the largest graphs are cycles with an odd number of vertices).

== Table of the orders of the largest known graphs for the undirected degree diameter problem ==
Below is the table of the vertex numbers for the best known graphs (as of 14 October 2026) in the undirected degree diameter problem for graphs of degree at most 3 ≤ d ≤ 16 and diameter 2 ≤ k ≤ 10. Only a few of the graphs in this table (marked in bold) are known to be optimal (that is, largest possible). The remainder are merely the largest so far discovered, and thus finding a larger graph that is closer in order (in terms of the size of the vertex set) to the Moore bound is considered an open problem. Some general constructions are known for values of d and k outside the range shown in the table.

k d	2	3	4	5	6	7	8	9	10
3	**10** (Note: The Petersen graph.)	**20** (Note: Optimal graphs proven optimal by Elspas (1964).)	**38** (Note: Optimal graph found by Doty (1982) and proven optimal by Buset (2000).)	70 (Note: Graph found by Alegre, Fiol & Yebra (1986).)	132 (Note: Graphs found by Exoo (2001).)	208 (Note: Graphs found by Ryosuke Mizuno in 2026 with Claude Code and ChatGPT assistance)	360 (Note: Graph found by Jianxiang Chen in 2018.)	600 (Note: Graph found by Geoffrey Exoo in 2010.)	1 250 (Note: Graph found by Conder (2006).)
4	**15**	41 (Note: Graph found by Allwright (1992).)	104 (Note: Graphs found by Nishant Bhakar in 2026 with Claude Fable assistance.)	364 (Note: Graphs found by Delorme (1985).)	760	1 344 (Note: Graphs found by Dharunish Yugeswardeenoo in 2026 using OpenAI GPT-5.6 Sol and Claude Fable 5 Max assistance.)	3 300	8 001	19 701
5	**24**	72	252 (Note: Graphs found by Rishabh Rajiv in 2026 using agentic coding systems.)	660	2 836	6 000	18 898	60 686	202 550
6	**32** (Note: Optimal graph found by Wegner (1977) and proven optimal by Molodtsov (2006).)	126	441	1 518	8 802	20 400 (Note: Graph found by Rithwik Gupta in 2026 with AI-assisted computational searches.)	80 050	331 387 (Note: Graph found by Canale & Rodríguez (2012).)	1 394 189
7	**50** (Note: The Hoffman–Singleton graph.)	170	684 (Note: Graph found by Michel de Messieres in 2026 with Claude assistance.)	2 810	12 654	56 952	264 440	1 332 774	6 645 690
8	57 (Note: Graphs found by Storwick (1970).)	253 (Note: Graph found by Margarida Mitjana and Francesc Comellas in 1995, and independently by Sampels (1997).)	1 100 (Note: Graph found by Eyal Loz in 2006.)	5 445	40 560	139 679	802 890	4 601 361	27 019 307
9	74	585	1 775 (Note: Graphs found by Francesc Comellas in 2026 using OpenAI GPT-6 Astra assistance)	9 020	77 418	309 510	1 961 496	13 219 318	89 543 818
10	91	650	2 614	33 397	137 180	624 690	4 524 979	34 913 494	265 612 889
11	106	715	3 671	37 631	186 119	1 197 748	9 739 368	81 961 120	697 280 200
12	133 (Note: Graphs found by Delorme & Farhi (1984).)	810	6 156	42 352	364 032	2 219 399	19 218 539	179 227 730	1 692 802 101
13	162 (Note: McKay–Miller–Širáň graph found by McKay, Miller & Širáň (1998).)	975	7 290	88 452	538 740	3 719 898	36 479 250	362 847 996	3 789 298 110
14	183	1 214	9 720	94 186 (Note: Graph found by Sami Hani Badaoui and Sarah Ellen Mary Vaughan in 2026 using OpenAI GPT-5.6 Sol on web interface.)	824 124	6 333 203	65 587 703	709 728 527	8 052 194 837
15	190	1 620 (Note: Graph found by Mike McCormick in 2026 using Claude.)	15 552	102 060	1 428 361	9 758 988	110 115 980	1 315 107 690	16 021 302 724
16	216	1 920 (Note: Graph found using ChatGPT web interface by Mizuno (2026).)	16 848	159 744	1 793 786	15 234 375	185 394 793	2 345 620 783	30 111 729 829

== Table of Moore bounds for the undirected degree diameter problem ==
The number of vertices in a simple undirected graph of maximum degree at most $d$ and diameter at most $k$ is bounded above by the Moore bound, which equals $1+d((d-1)^k-1)/(d-2)$ when $d \geq 3$. Moreover, this bound is attained by finitely many Moore graphs. The table of Moore bounds is given below, with Moore graphs marked in bold.

k d	2	3	4	5	6	7	8	9	10
3	**10**	22	46	94	190	382	766	1 534	3 070
4	17	53	161	485	1 457	4 373	13 121	39 365	118 097
5	26	106	426	1 706	6 826	27 306	109 226	436 906	1 747 626
6	37	187	937	4687	23 437	117 187	585 937	2 929 687	14 648 437
7	**50**	302	1 814	10 886	65 318	391 910	2 351 462	14 108 774	84 652 646
8	65	457	3 201	22 409	156 865	1 098 057	7 686 401	53 804 809	376 633 665
9	82	658	5 266	42 130	337 042	2 696 338	21 570 706	172 565 650	1 380 525 202
10	101	911	8 201	73 811	664 301	5 978 711	53 808 401	484 275 611	4 358 480 501
11	122	1 222	12 222	122 222	1 222 222	12 222 222	122 222 222	1 222 222 222	12 222 222 222
12	145	1 597	17 569	193 261	2 125 873	23 384 605	257 230 657	2 829 537 229	31 124 909 521
13	170	2 042	24 506	294 074	3 528 890	42 346 682	508 160 186	6 097 922 234	73 175 066 810
14	197	2 563	33 321	433 175	5 631 277	73 206 603	951 685 841	12 371 915 935	160 834 907 157
15	226	3 166	44 326	620 566	8 687 926	121 630 966	1 702 833 526	23 839 669 366	333 755 371 126
16	257	3 857	57 857	867 857	13 017 857	195 267 857	2 929 017 857	43 935 267 857	659 029 017 857
