= Convex subgraph =

In this graph, triangle 1-2-5 is convex, but path 2-3-4 is not, because it does not include one of the two shortest paths from 2 to 4.

In metric graph theory, a convex subgraph of an undirected graph G is a subgraph that includes every shortest path in G between two of its vertices. Thus, it is analogous to the definition of a convex set in geometry, a set that contains the line segment between every pair of its points.

Convex subgraphs play an important role in the theory of partial cubes and median graphs. In particular, in median graphs, the convex subgraphs have the Helly property: if a family of convex subgraphs has the property that all pairwise intersections are nonempty, then the whole family has a nonempty intersection.
