= MaxDDBS =

The Maximum Degree-and-Diameter-Bounded Subgraph problem (MaxDDBS) is a problem in graph theory.

== Definition ==
Given a connected host graph $G$, an upper bound for the degree $\Delta$, and an upper bound for the diameter $D$, we look for the largest subgraph $S$ of $G$ with maximum degree at most $\Delta$ and diameter at most $D$.

This problem is also referred to as the Degree-Diameter Subgraph Problem, as it contains the degree diameter problem as a special case (namely, by taking a sufficiently large complete graph as a host graph). Despite being a natural generalization of the Degree-Diameter Problem, MaxDDBS only began to be investigated in 2011, while research in the Degree-Diameter Problem has been active since the 1960s.

There is also a weighted version of the problem (MaxWDDBS) where edges have positive integral weights, and the diameter is measured as the sum of weights along the shortest path.

== Computational complexity ==
Regarding its computational complexity, the problem is NP-hard, and not in APX (i.e. it cannot be approximated to within a constant factor in polynomial time). The problem remains NP-hard even when restricting to only one constraint (either degree or diameter).

The Largest Degree-Bounded Subgraph Problem is NP-hard when the subgraph must be connected, while the Maximum Diameter-Bounded Subgraph becomes the maximum clique problem for $D = 1$, which was one of Karp's 21 NP-complete problems.

== Bounds and relationships ==
The order of any graph with maximum degree $\Delta$ and diameter $D$ cannot exceed the Moore bound:

$$M_{\Delta,D} = 1 + \Delta + \Delta(\Delta - 1) + \cdots + \Delta(\Delta - 1)^{D-1}$$

This bound also serves as a theoretical upper bound for MaxDDBS. If we denote by $N_{\Delta,D}$ the order of the largest graph with maximum degree $\Delta$ and diameter $D$, then for any solution $S$ of MaxDDBS with $n$ vertices:

$$n \leq N_{\Delta,D} \leq M_{\Delta,D}$$

== Applications ==
MaxDDBS has diverse practical applications:

- Parallel and distributed computing: Communication time is crucial in parallel processing. Identifying a subnetwork of bounded degree and diameter within a parallel architecture enables efficient computation.
- Network security and botnets: In botnet analysis, attackers may select subnetworks with specific degree and diameter constraints to maximize damage while avoiding detection. Understanding MaxDDBS helps predict attacking network parameters and develop defensive measures.
- Biological networks: The problem has been applied to protein interaction networks to identify network cores. Bounding both degree and diameter (rather than diameter alone) can reveal richer interaction patterns.

== Algorithms ==
A greedy heuristic algorithm has been proposed for MaxWDDBS with a worst-case approximation ratio of $\frac{\min(n,N_{\Delta,D})}{\Delta+1}$, where $n$ is the number of vertices in the host graph. The algorithm starts with a $\Delta$-star and grows the subgraph by adding edges incident to live vertices until no more edges can be added while maintaining the degree constraint.

For the diameter-bounded variant alone, an algorithm exists with approximation ratio $O(n^{1/2})$.

Experimental studies on various host graphs show that the greedy algorithm often performs significantly better than its theoretical worst-case bound suggests, such as on antiprism graphs or random graphs (Watts-Strogatz and Barabási-Albert models).

== Special cases in specific host graphs ==
The problem has been studied for various host graph families, with bounds established for mesh networks, hypercubes, honeycomb networks, triangular networks, butterfly networks, Beneš networks, and oxide networks.

=== Mesh networks ===
When the host graph is a $k$ -dimensional mesh, the problem relates to counting lattice points in balls under the L^{1} metric.

For a mesh with $\Delta = 2k$, the largest subgraph contains as many vertices as lattice points in a closed ball of radius $D/2$.

The number of lattice points $|B_k(p)|$ in a maximal ball of radius $p$ in $k$ dimensions is given by:

- For even diameter $D = 2p$: These are the Delannoy numbers
- For odd diameter $D = 2p + 1$: These form a Riordan array of coordination sequences

Specific constructions have been developed for:

- 3D mesh with $\Delta = 4$:
  - Achieves $\frac{4p^3}{3} + 2p^2 - \frac{4p}{3} + 3$ vertices for $D = 2p$
- 2D mesh with $\Delta = 3$:
  - Achieves $2p^2 - 2p + 1$ vertices for $D = 2p$

These constructions are asymptotically optimal, with average degree approaching $\Delta$ as $p \to \infty$.

=== Hypercube ===
For the $k$-dimensional hypercube $Q_k$, when $D \leq \Delta$, there exists a subcube $Q_\Delta$ containing a subgraph of order:

$$\Phi_\Delta(D) = \sum_{i=0}^{D} \binom{\Delta}{i}$$

This represents the volume of a Hamming ball of radius $D$.
