= Lennox Superville =

Trinidadian-American professor, mathematician, and engineer

- Born: Lennox Emmanuel Superville; June 10, 1942 (age 84); Fyzabad, Trinidad and Tobago
- Occupation: Professor

Academic background
- Education: Hunter College, New York, NY, (B.A., M.A.) in Mathematics
- Alma mater: Graduate Center of the City University of New York), Ph.D. in Mathematics
- Thesis: Various Aspects of Max Algebra (1978)
- Doctoral advisor: Alan Jerome Hoffman

Academic work
- Discipline: Mathematics
- Sub-discipline: Algebra

Lennox Emmanuel Superville (born June 10, 1942) is a Trinidadian-American professor, mathematician, and engineer.

== Early life and education ==
Lennox E. Superville was born on June 10, 1942, in Fyzabad, Trinidad and Tobago. While attending Nelson Street Boys' R.C. School in Port of Spain, Trinidad, his mother unexpectedly died from a heart attack at St. Ann's Hospital Port of Spain, Trinidad.

After transitioning from Nelson Street Boys' RC School in 1955, he enrolled at Osmond High School in San Juan, Trinidad and Tobago.

On August 28, 1966, he moved to New York City to pursue his Ph.D. in mathematics. He earned a Bachelor of Arts in mathematics at Hunter College, New York City, in 1970, followed by his master of arts in 1972. He then completed his Ph.D. in mathematics in 1978, becoming the first Trinidadian American to earn a Ph.D. in mathematics at the Graduate Center of the City University of New York (CUNY). Superville's doctoral advisor was Alan Jerome Hoffman. His doctoral thesis was Various Aspects of Max Algebra.

== Career ==
Superville started teaching Mathematics at Hunter College, New York City as an adjunct professor in 1972 and became a tenured assistant professor in 1978. He also lectured as an adjunct professor in Basic Programming at Columbia University in the New York City in Summer 1977, Biostatistics for Nurses at St. Joseph College Brooklyn, 1978, and was the editor and author of Basic Skills: Arithmetic and Algebra, A modular Approach (1978, 1979) for first-year students entering CUNY under Open Admissions. Superville was Co-Chair of the Journal of the CUNY Mathematics Discussion Group (1978-79).

In 1980, he joined the American Telephone and Telegraph Company (AT&T) Operations Center in Bedminster, New Jersey, as a member of the technical staff to provide internal technical support and offer technical expertise to several departments across AT&T longlines. During his 2-year tenure, he was involved in the United States v. AT&T antitrust case that led to the 1982 Bell System divestiture and the testing of the cordless phone operating at a frequency of 2.7 MHz. As a member of the Technical Staff at AT&T, Superville also evaluated programming codes on aircraft command control systems and verified heuristic algorithms.

Then in 1982, he became the manager of network architecture at Radio Corporation of America (RCA) in Princeton, New Jersey, where he managed the design of the network devices and services to serve the connectivity needs of their client devices with key emphasis on the provision of visibility into the national network's operation.

Superville then joined Bell-Northern Research/Northern Telecom (BNR/Nortel Networks) in Research Triangle Park (RTP), North Carolina, in 1987 as a member of the scientific staff to develop knowledge and new technologies across the telecommunication sector. As a member of the scientific at Bell Northern Research, he conducted research on the simulation of processes on telecommunication and auto industry systems, prepared presentations on broadband communications opportunities for switched manufacturers and telephone companies, and the developed technical requirements for computer-aided design/computer-aided manufacturing (CAD/CAM) network. He also worked with teams that prepared reports on high-performance scientific computing and telecommunications planning for the 1990s.

In 1989, he set up LESA Communications in Raleigh, North Carolina. LESA Communications focused on installations of satellite dishes in Trinidad and Tobago. He was also a chief information officer at the North Carolina Office of the State Auditor in Raleigh, North Carolina.

In 1990, he joined the North Carolina Department of Public Instruction (NCDPI), Raleigh, North Carolina, as an assistant information systems director to establish IT policies. During his tenure, he was nominated for the Governor's award for excellence in technology innovation.

In 1993, he was appointed as the chief information officer at the Office of the State Auditor (NCOSA) in Raleigh, North Carolina. As a North Carolina State Auditor's Cabinet member, he managed information technology for NCOSA. He also had authority over IT project approval and oversight, IT procurement, IT security, and IT planning and budgeting.

In 2010, Superville joined Keshav Consulting in Cary, North Carolina as a Senior Advisor and was the Principal Investigator in generating Photovoltaic electricity from US Roadways. After he retired from NCOSA in January 2009, he founded Infosysarchitecture. Since 2017, he has been working with National Energy Partners on solar power and photovoltaic (PV) systems.

== Research and current academic work ==
In 2012, Superville joined ITT Technical Institute as an adjunct professor to teach advanced calculus, specializing in elementary-point set theory and properties of continuous functions, differential equations, and Fourier analysis.

Superville currently resides in Raleigh, North Carolina.
