= Chordal bipartite graph =

Every cycle of length at least 6 has a chord connecting two vertices that are a distance > 1 apart from each other in the cycle.

In the mathematical area of graph theory, a chordal bipartite graph is a bipartite graph B = (X,Y,E) in which every cycle of length at least 6 in B has a chord, i.e., an edge that connects two vertices that are a distance > 1 apart from each other in the cycle. A better name would be weakly chordal and bipartite since chordal bipartite graphs are in general not chordal as the induced cycle of length 4 shows.

== Characterizations ==
Chordal bipartite graphs have various characterizations in terms of perfect elimination orderings, hypergraphs and matrices. They are closely related to strongly chordal graphs. By definition, chordal bipartite graphs have a forbidden subgraph characterization as the graphs that do not contain any induced cycle of length 3 or of length at least 5 (so-called holes) as an induced subgraph. Thus, a graph G is chordal bipartite if and only if G is triangle-free and hole-free. In Golumbic (1980), two other characterizations are mentioned: B is chordal bipartite if and only if every minimal edge separator induces a complete bipartite subgraph in B if and only if every induced subgraph is perfect elimination bipartite.

Martin Farber has shown: A graph is strongly chordal if and only if the bipartite incidence graph of its clique hypergraph is chordal bipartite.

A similar characterization holds for the closed neighborhood hypergraph: A graph is strongly chordal if and only if the bipartite incidence graph of its closed neighborhood hypergraph is chordal bipartite.

Another result found by Elias Dahlhaus is: A bipartite graph B = (X,Y,E) is chordal bipartite if and only if the split graph resulting from making X a clique is strongly chordal.

A bipartite graph B = (X,Y,E) is chordal bipartite if and only if every induced subgraph of B has a maximum X-neighborhood ordering and a maximum Y-neighborhood ordering.

Various results describe the relationship between chordal bipartite graphs and totally balanced neighborhood hypergraphs of bipartite graphs.

A characterization of chordal bipartite graphs in terms of intersection graphs related to hypergraphs is given in.

A bipartite graph is chordal bipartite if and only if its adjacency matrix is totally balanced if and only if the adjacency matrix is Gamma-free.

== Recognition ==
Chordal bipartite graphs can be recognized in time O(min(n^{2}, (n + m) log n)) for a graph with n vertices and m edges.

== Complexity of problems ==
Various problems such as Hamiltonian cycle, Steiner tree and Efficient Domination remain NP-complete on chordal bipartite graphs.

Various other problems which can be solved efficiently for bipartite graphs can be solved more efficiently for chordal bipartite graphs as discussed in

== Related graph classes ==
Every chordal bipartite graph is a modular graph. The chordal bipartite graphs include the complete bipartite graphs and the bipartite distance-hereditary graphs.
