= Majority logic decoding =

Method to decode repetition codes

In error detection and correction, majority logic decoding is a method to decode repetition codes, based on the assumption that the largest number of occurrences of a symbol was the transmitted symbol.

== Theory ==
In a binary alphabet made of $0,1$, if a $(n,1)$ repetition code is used, then each input bit is mapped to the code word as a string of $n$-replicated input bits. Generally $n=2t + 1$, an odd number.

The repetition codes can detect up to $[n/2]$ transmission errors. Decoding errors occur when more than these transmission errors occur. Thus, assuming bit-transmission errors are independent, the probability of error for a repetition code is given by $P_e = \sum_{k=\frac{n+1}{2}}^{n} {n \choose k} \epsilon^{k} (1-\epsilon)^{(n-k)}$, where $\epsilon$ is the error over the transmission channel.

== Algorithm ==
Assumption: the code word is $(n,1)$, where $n=2t+1$, an odd number.

- Calculate the $d_H$ Hamming weight of the repetition code.
- if $d_H \le t$, decode code word to be all 0's
- if $d_H \ge t+1$, decode code word to be all 1's

This algorithm is a boolean function in its own right, the majority function.

== Example ==
In a $(n,1)$ code, if R=[1 0 1 1 0], then it would be decoded as,

- $n=5, t=2$, $d_H = 3$, so R'=[1 1 1 1 1]
- Hence the transmitted message bit was 1.
