= Table of vertex-symmetric digraphs =

The best known vertex transitive digraphs (as of October 2008) in the directed Degree diameter problem are tabulated below.

== Table of the orders of the largest known vertex-symmetric graphs for the directed degree diameter problem ==
k d	2	3	4	5	6	7	8	9	10	11
2	6 (Note: Family of digraphs found by Kautz (1969).)	10 (Note: Cayley digraphs found by Michael J. Dinneen. Details about these graphs are available in a paper by the author.)	20 (Note: Cayley digraphs found by Michael J. Dinneen. The complete set of Cayley digraphs in that order was found by Eyal Loz.)	27	72 (Note: Cayley digraphs found by Paul Hafner. Details about these graphs are available in a paper by the author.)	144	171	336 (Note: Family of digraphs found by Faber & Moore (1988).)	504	737
3	12	27	60 (Note: Digraph found by Faber & Moore (1988). The complete set of Cayley digraphs in that order was found by Eyal Loz.)	165 (Note: Cayley digraph found by Paul Hafner. The complete set of Cayley digraphs in that order was found by Eyal Loz.)	333	1 152 (Note: Digraphs found by Comellas & Fiol (1995).)	2 041 (Note: Cayley digraphs found by Eyal Loz. More details are available in Loz & Širáň (2008).)	5 115	11 568	41 472
4	20	60	168	465	1 378	7 200	14 400 (Note: Digraphs found by J. Gómez.)	42 309	137 370	648 000
5	30	120	360	1 152	3 775	28 800	86 400	259 200	1 010 658	5 184 000
6	42	210	840	2 520	9 020	88 200	352 800	1 411 200	5 184 000	27 783 000
7	56	336	1 680	6 720	20 160	225 792	1 128 960	5 644 800	27 783 000	113 799 168
8	72	504	3 024	15 120	60 480	508 032	3 048 192	18 289 152	113 799 168	457 228 800
9	90	720	5 040	30 240	151 200	1 036 800	7 257 600	50 803 200	384 072 192	1 828 915 200
10	110	990	7 920	55 400	332 640	1 960 200	15 681 600	125 452 800	1 119 744 000	6 138 320 000
11	132	1 320	11 880	95 040	665 280	3 991 680	31 152 000	282 268 800	2 910 897 000	18 065 203 200
12	156	1 716	17 160	154 440	1 235 520	8 648 640	58 893 120	588 931 200	6 899 904 000	47 703 427 200
13	182	2 184	24 024	240 240	2 162 160	17 297 280	121 080 960	1 154 305 152	15 159 089 098	115 430 515 200

The footnotes in the table indicate the origin of the digraph that achieves the given number of vertices:
