= Hoffman–Singleton graph =

7-regular undirected graph with 50 nodes and 175 edges

- Named after: Alan J. Hoffman; Robert R. Singleton
- Vertices: 50
- Edges: 175
- Radius: 2
- Diameter: 2
- Girth: 5
- Automorphisms: 252,000 (PSU(3,5^{2}):2)
- Chromatic number: 4
- Chromatic index: 7
- Genus: 29
- Properties: Strongly regular Symmetric; Hamiltonian; Integral; Cage; Moore graph

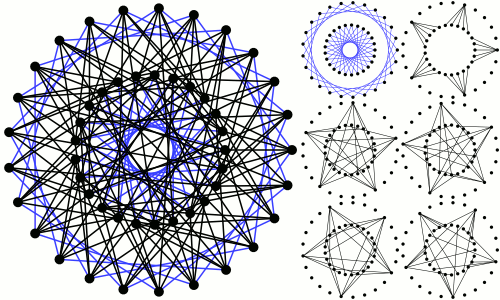
The Hoffman–Singleton graph. The subgraph of blue edges is a sum of ten disjoint pentagons.

In the mathematical field of graph theory, the Hoffman–Singleton graph is a 7-regular undirected graph with 50 vertices and 175 edges. It is the unique strongly regular graph with parameters (50,7,0,1). It was constructed by Alan Hoffman and Robert Singleton while trying to classify all Moore graphs, and is the highest-order Moore graph known to exist. Since it is a Moore graph where each vertex has degree 7, and the girth is 5, it is a (7,5)-cage.

== Construction ==
Here are some constructions of the Hoffman–Singleton graph.

=== Construction from pentagons and pentagrams ===
Take five pentagons P_{h} and five pentagrams Q_{i} . Join vertex j of P_{h} to vertex h · i + j of Q_{i} (all indices are modulo 5.)

=== Construction from PG(3,2) ===
Take a Fano plane on seven elements, such as {abc, ade, afg, bef, bdg, cdf, ceg} and apply all 2520 even permutations on the 7-set abcdefg. Canonicalize each such Fano plane (e.g. by reducing to lexicographic order) and discard duplicates. Exactly 15 Fano planes remain. Each 3-set (triplet) of the set abcdefg is present in exactly 3 Fano planes. The incidence between the 35 triplets and 15 Fano planes induces PG(3,2), with 15 points and 35 lines. To make the Hoffman-Singleton graph, create a graph vertex for each of the 15 Fano planes and 35 triplets. Connect each Fano plane to its 7 triplets, like a Levi graph, and also connect disjoint triplets to each other like the odd graph O(4).

A very similar construction from PG(3,2) is used to build the Higman–Sims graph, which has the Hoffman-Singleton graph as a subgraph.

=== Construction on a groupoid/magma ===
Let $G$ be the set $\mathbb{Z}_2\times\mathbb{Z}_5\times\mathbb{Z}_5$. Define a binary operation $\circ$ on $G$ such that for each $(a,b,c)$ and $(x,y,z)$ in $G$, $(a,b,c)\circ(x,y,z)=(a+x,b-bx+y,c+(-1)^a by+2^az)$. Then the Hoffman-Singleton graph has vertices $g \in G$ and that there exists an edge between $g \in G$ and $g'\in G$ whenever $g'=g\circ s$ for some $s \in \{(0,0,1),(0,0,4),(1,0,0),(1,1,0),(1,2,0),(1,3,0),(1,4,0)\}$. (Although the authors use the word "groupoid", it is in the sense of a binary function or magma, not in the category-theoretic sense. Also note there is a typo in the formula in the paper: the paper has $(-1)^x by$ in the last term, but that does not produce the Hoffman-Singleton graph. It should instead be $(-1)^a by$ as written here.)

== Algebraic properties ==
The automorphism group of the Hoffman–Singleton graph is a group of order 252,000 isomorphic to PΣU(3,5^{2}), the semidirect product of the projective special unitary group PSU(3,5^{2}) with the cyclic group of order 2 generated by the Frobenius automorphism. It acts transitively on the vertices, on the edges and on the arcs of the graph. Therefore, the Hoffman–Singleton graph is a symmetric graph. As a permutation group on 50 symbols, it can be generated by the following two permutations applied recursively

$$(1\ 44\ 22\ 49\ 17\ 43\ 9\ 46\ 40\ 45)
(2\ 23\ 24\ 14\ 18\ 10\ 12\ 42\ 38\ 6)
(3\ 41\ 19\ 4\ 15\ 20\ 7\ 13\ 37\ 8)
(5\ 28\ 21\ 29\ 16\ 25\ 11\ 26\ 39\ 30)
(27\ 47)
(31\ 36\ 34\ 32\ 35)
(33\ 50)$$

and

$$(1\ 7\ 48\ 47\ 41\ 46\ 17)
(2\ 39\ 11\ 4\ 15\ 14\ 42)
(3\ 32\ 28\ 9\ 23\ 6\ 43)
(5\ 22\ 38\ 18\ 44\ 36\ 29)
(8\ 37\ 40\ 34\ 26\ 49\ 24)
(10\ 16\ 31\ 27\ 13\ 21\ 45)
(19\ 33\ 25\ 35\ 50\ 30\ 20)$$

The stabilizer of a vertex of the graph is isomorphic to the symmetric group S_{7} on 7 letters. The setwise stabilizer of an edge is isomorphic to Aut(A_{6}) = A_{6}.2^{2}, where A_{6} is the alternating group on 6 letters. Both of the two types of stabilizers are maximal subgroups of the whole automorphism group of the Hoffman–Singleton graph.

The characteristic polynomial of the Hoffman–Singleton graph is equal to $(x-7)(x-2)^{28}(x+3)^{21}$. Therefore, the Hoffman–Singleton graph is an integral graph: its spectrum consists entirely of integers.

The Hoffman-Singleton graph has exactly 100 independent sets of size 15 each. Each independent set is disjoint from exactly 7 other independent sets. The 100-vertex graph that connects disjoint independent sets can be partitioned into two 50-vertex subgraphs, each of which is isomorphic to the Hoffman-Singleton graph, in an unusual case of self-replicating + multiplying behavior.

== Subgraphs and supergraphs ==
There are 1260 5-cycles and 5250 6-cycles in the Hoffman–Singleton graph. There are 525 copies of the Petersen graph, with each 6-cycle belonging to exactly one Petersen each. Removing any one Petersen leaves a copy of the unique (6,5)-cage. The Hoffman Singleton graph also contains the odd graph O(4), the Coxeter graph, and the Tutte-Coxeter graph as subgraphs.

Take any edge of the Hoffman-Singleton graph, and discard those two vertices as well as the 12 vertices directly connected to either of them. The graph that remains is the Sylvester graph on 36 vertices. Because each such edge can be mapped to a distinct Sylvester graph, there are 175 copies of the Sylvester graph in the Hoffman Singleton graph.

The Hoffman Singleton graph is contained in the Higman–Sims graph which is therefore a supergraph.

== See also ==
- McKay–Miller–Širáň graphs, a class of graphs including the Hoffman–Singleton graph
- Table of the largest known graphs of a given diameter and maximal degree
