= Modular graph =

Mathematical graph with at least one median per triple of vertices

A modular graph derived from a modular lattice

In graph theory, a branch of mathematics, the modular graphs are undirected graphs in which every three vertices x, y, and z have at least one median vertex m(x, y, z) that belongs to shortest paths between each pair of x, y, and z. Their name comes from the fact that a finite lattice is a modular lattice if and only if its Hasse diagram is a modular graph.

It is not possible for a modular graph to contain a cycle of odd length. For, if C is a shortest odd cycle in a graph, x is a vertex of C, and yz is the edge of C farthest from x, there could be no median m(x, y, z). In this case, the only vertices on the shortest path yz are y and z themselves. Neither can belong to a shortest path from x to the other without shortcutting C and creating a shorter odd cycle. Because they have no odd cycles, every modular graph is a bipartite graph.

The modular graphs contain as a special case the median graphs, in which every triple of vertices has a unique median; median graphs are related to distributive lattices in the same way that modular graphs are related to modular lattices. However, the modular graphs also include other graphs such as the complete bipartite graphs where the medians are not unique: when the three vertices x, y, and z all belong to one side of the bipartition of a complete bipartite graph, every vertex on the other side is a median. Every chordal bipartite graph (a class of graphs that includes the complete bipartite graphs and the bipartite distance-hereditary graphs) is modular.
