= Median algebra =

In mathematics, a median algebra is a set with a ternary operation $\langle x,y,z \rangle$ satisfying a set of axioms which generalise the notions of medians of triples of real numbers and of the Boolean majority function.

The axioms are

1. $\langle x,y,y \rangle = y$
2. $\langle x,y,z \rangle = \langle z,x,y \rangle$
3. $\langle x,y,z \rangle = \langle x,z,y \rangle$
4. $\langle \langle x,w,y\rangle ,w,z \rangle = \langle x,w, \langle y,w,z \rangle\rangle$

The second and third axioms imply commutativity: it is possible (but not easy) to show that in the presence of the other three, axiom (3) is redundant. The fourth axiom implies associativity. There are other possible axiom systems: for example the two

- $\langle x,y,y \rangle = y$
- $\langle u,v, \langle u,w,x \rangle\rangle = \langle u,x, \langle w,u,v \rangle\rangle$

also suffice.

In a Boolean algebra, or more generally a distributive lattice, the median function $\langle x,y,z \rangle = (x \vee y) \wedge (y \vee z) \wedge (z \vee x)$ satisfies these axioms, so that every Boolean algebra and every distributive lattice forms a median algebra.

Birkhoff and Kiss showed that a median algebra with elements 0 and 1 satisfying $\langle0,x,1 \rangle = x$ is a distributive lattice.

== Relation to median graphs ==
A median graph is an undirected graph in which for every three vertices $x$, $y$, and $z$ there is a unique vertex $\langle x,y,z \rangle$ that belongs to shortest paths between any two of $x$, $y$, and $z$. If this is the case, then the operation $\langle x,y,z \rangle$ defines a median algebra having the vertices of the graph as its elements.

Conversely, in any median algebra, one may define an interval $[x, z]$ to be the set of elements $y$ such that $\langle x,y,z \rangle = y$. One may define a graph from a median algebra by creating a vertex for each algebra element and an edge for each pair $(x, z)$ such that the interval $[x, z]$ contains no other elements. If the algebra has the property that every interval is finite, then this graph is a median graph, and it accurately represents the algebra in that the median operation defined by shortest paths on the graph coincides with the algebra's original median operation.
