= Diameter (group theory) =

Concept in group theory

In the area of abstract algebra known as group theory, the diameter of a finite group is a measure of its complexity.

Consider a finite group $\left(G,\circ\right)$, and any set of generators S. Define $D_S$ to be the graph diameter of the Cayley graph $\Lambda=\left(G,S\right)$. Then the diameter of $\left(G,\circ\right)$ is the largest value of $D_S$ taken over all generating sets S.

For instance, every finite cyclic group of order s, the Cayley graph for a generating set with one generator is an s-vertex cycle graph. The diameter of this graph, and of the group, is $\lfloor s/2\rfloor$.

It is conjectured, for all non-abelian finite simple groups G, that

$$\operatorname{diam}(G) \leqslant \left(\log|G|\right)^{\mathcal{O}(1)}.$$

Many partial results are known but the full conjecture remains open.
