= Cage (graph theory) =

Regular graph with fewest possible nodes for its girth

The Tutte (3,8)-cage.

In the mathematical field of graph theory, a cage is a regular graph that has as few vertices as possible for its girth.

Formally, an (r, g)-graph is defined to be a graph in which each vertex has exactly r neighbors, and in which the shortest cycle has a length of exactly g. An (r, g)-cage is an (r, g)-graph with the smallest possible number of vertices, among all (r, g)-graphs. A (3, g)-cage is often called a g-cage.

It is known that an (r, g)-graph exists for any combination of r ≥ 2 and g ≥ 3. It follows that all (r, g)-cages exist.

If a Moore graph exists with degree r and girth g, it must be a cage. Moreover, the bounds on the sizes of Moore graphs generalize to cages: any cage with odd girth g must have at least

$$1 + r\sum_{i=0}^{(g-3)/2}(r-1)^i$$

vertices, and any cage with even girth g must have at least

$$2\sum_{i=0}^{(g-2)/2}(r-1)^i$$

vertices. Any (r, g)-graph with exactly this many vertices is by definition a Moore graph and therefore automatically a cage.

There may exist multiple cages for a given combination of r and g. For instance there are three non-isomorphic (3, 10)-cages, each with 70 vertices: the Balaban 10-cage, the Harries graph and the Harries–Wong graph. But there is only one (3, 11)-cage: the Balaban 11-cage (with 112 vertices).

== Known cages ==
A 1-regular graph has no cycle, and a connected 2-regular graph has girth equal to its number of vertices, so cages are only of interest for r ≥ 3. The (r,3)-cage is a complete graph K_{r+1} on r + 1 vertices, and the (r,4)-cage is a complete bipartite graph K_{r,r} on 2r vertices.

Notable cages include:

- (3,5)-cage: the Petersen graph, 10 vertices
- (3,6)-cage: the Heawood graph, 14 vertices
- (3,7)-cage: the McGee graph, 24 vertices
- (3,8)-cage: the Tutte–Coxeter graph, 30 vertices
- (3,10)-cage: the Balaban 10-cage, 70 vertices
- (3,11)-cage: the Balaban 11-cage, 112 vertices
- (3,12)-cage: the Tutte 12-cage, 126 vertices
- (4,5)-cage: the Robertson graph, 19 vertices
- (7,5)-cage: The Hoffman–Singleton graph, 50 vertices.
- When r − 1 is a prime power, the (r,6) cages are the incidence graphs of projective planes.
- When r − 1 is a prime power, the (r,8) and (r,12) cages are generalized polygons.

The numbers of vertices in the known (r,g) cages, for values of r > 2 and g > 2, other than projective planes and generalized polygons, are:

g r	3	4	5	6	7	8	9	10	11	12
3	4	6	10	14	24	30	58	70	112	126
4	5	8	19	26	67	80				728
5	6	10	30	42		170				2730
6	7	12	40	62		312				7812
7	8	14	50	90						

== Asymptotics ==
For large values of g, the Moore bound implies that the number n of vertices must grow at least exponentially as a function of g. Equivalently, g can be at most proportional to the logarithm of n. More precisely,

$$g \le 2\log_{r-1} n + O(1).$$

It is believed that this bound is tight or close to tight (Bollobás & Szemerédi 2002). The best known lower bounds on g are also logarithmic, but with a smaller constant factor (implying that n grows exponentially but at a higher rate than the Moore bound). Specifically, the construction of Ramanujan graphs defined by Lubotzky, Phillips & Sarnak (1988) satisfy the bound

$$g \ge \frac{4}{3}\log_{r-1} n + O(1).$$

This bound was improved slightly by Lazebnik, Ustimenko & Woldar (1995).

It is unlikely that these graphs are themselves cages, but their existence gives an upper bound to the number of vertices needed in a cage.
