= David Sumner =

American mathematician

David P. Sumner is an American mathematician known for his research in graph theory. He formulated Sumner's conjecture that tournaments are universal graphs for polytrees in 1971, and showed in 1974 that all claw-free graphs with an even number of vertices have perfect matchings. He and András Gyárfás independently formulated the Gyárfás–Sumner conjecture according to which, for every tree T, the T-free graphs are χ-bounded.

Sumner earned his doctorate from the University of Massachusetts Amherst in 1970, under the supervision of David J. Foulis. He is a distinguished professor emeritus at the University of South Carolina.
