= Grötzsch =

Grötzsch or Groetzsch may refer to:

- Herbert Grötzsch, German mathematician
- Grötzsch, German name for Grodziszcze, Żary County, a village in Poland

== See also ==
- Grötzsch graph
- Grötzsch's theorem
