= Jan Mycielski =

Polish-American mathematician (1932–2025)

- Born: February 7, 1932; Wiśniowa, Poland
- Died: January 18, 2025 (aged 92)
- Education: University of Wrocław
- Known for: Ehrenfeucht–Mycielski sequence; Mycielskian; Mycielski–Grötzsch graph; Mycielski's theorem; Axiom of determinacy; graph theory
- Awards: Stefan Banach Prize (1965); Fellow of the American Mathematical Society (2012)
- Scientific career
- Fields: Mathematics
- Workplaces: University of Colorado at Boulder; French National Centre for Scientific Research; Polish Academy of Sciences; University of California, Berkeley; Case Western Reserve University

Jan Mycielski (Polish: [jan mɨˈt͡ɕɛlskʲi]; February 7, 1932 – January 18, 2025) was a Polish-American mathematician, logician, and philosopher who was a professor of mathematics at the University of Colorado at Boulder.

He is known for contributions to graph theory, combinatorics, set theory, topology, and the philosophy of mathematics.

== Life and career ==
Mycielski was born in Wiśniowa, Podkarpackie Voivodeship, Poland on February 2, 1932.

Mycielski received his Ph.D. in mathematics from the University of Wrocław in 1957 under the supervision of Stanisław Hartman. His dissertation was entitled "Applications of Free Groups to Geometrical Constructions".

Following positions at the Centre National de la Recherche Scientifique in Paris, the Institute of Mathematics of the Polish Academy of Sciences, the University of California, Berkeley, and Case Western Reserve University, in 1969 he took a permanent faculty position at the University of Colorado at Boulder.

Mycielski died in January 2025, aged 92.

== Contributions ==
Among the mathematical concepts named after Mycielski are:

- The Ehrenfeucht–Mycielski sequence, a sequence of binary digits with pseudorandom properties
- The Mycielskian, a construction for embedding any undirected graph into a larger graph with strictly higher chromatic number without creating any additional triangles.
- The Mycielski–Grötzsch graph, the Mycielskian of the 5-cycle, an 11-vertex triangle-free graph that is the smallest possible triangle-free graph requiring four colors.
- Mycielski's theorem that there exist triangle-free graphs with arbitrarily large chromatic number.

== Awards and honors ==
In 1965, he received the Stefan Banach Prize of the Polish Mathematical Society.

In 1990, he was awarded the Sierpiński Medal and Lecture by the Polish Mathematical Society.

In 2012, he became a fellow of the American Mathematical Society.

== Selected works ==
- 1991. A Note on S. M. Ulam's Mathematics.

A note in Adventures of a Mathematician. Stanislaw Ulam. University of California Press, 1991. ISBN 0520071549

== See also ==
- List of Polish mathematicians
