= Zdeněk Dvořák =

Czech mathematician

Zdeněk Dvořák (born April 26, 1981) is a Czech mathematician specializing in graph theory.

Dvořák was born in Nové Město na Moravě. He competed on the Czech national team in the 1999 International Mathematical Olympiad, and in the same year in the International Olympiad in Informatics, where he won a gold medal. He earned his Ph.D. in 2007 from Charles University in Prague, under the supervision of Jaroslav Nešetřil. He remained as a research fellow at Charles University until 2010, and then did postdoctoral studies at the Georgia Institute of Technology and Simon Fraser University. He then returned to the Computer Science Institute (IUUK) of Charles University, obtained his habilitation in 2012, and has been a full professor there since 2022.

He was one of three winners of the 2015 European Prize in Combinatorics, "for his fundamental contributions to graph theory, in particular for his work on structural aspects of graph theory, including solutions to Havel's 1969 problem and the Heckman–Thomas 14/5 problem on fractional colourings of cubic triangle-free graphs. This refers to two different results of Dvořák:

- Havel's conjecture is a strengthening of Grötzsch's theorem. It states that there exists a constant d such that, if a planar graph has no two triangles within distance d of each other, then it can be colored with three colors. A proof of this conjecture of Havel was announced by Dvořák and his co-authors in 2009.
- C. C. Heckman and Robin Thomas conjectured in 2001 that triangle-free graphs of maximum degree three have fractional chromatic number at most 14/5. A proof was announced by Dvořák and his co-authors in 2013 and published by them in 2014.
