= Shift graph =

In graph theory, the shift graph G_{n,k} for $n,k \in \mathbb{N},\ n > 2k > 0$ is the graph whose vertices correspond to the ordered $k$-tuples $a = (a_1, a_2, \dotsc, a_k)$ with $1 \leq a_1 < a_2 < \cdots < a_k \leq n$ and where two vertices $a, b$ are adjacent if and only if $a_i = b_{i+1}$ or $a_{i+1} = b_i$ for all $1 \leq i \leq k-1$. Shift graphs are triangle-free, and for fixed $k$ their chromatic number tend to infinity with $n$. It is natural to enhance the shift graph $G_{n,k}$ with the orientation $a \to b$ if $a_{i+1}=b_i$ for all $1\leq i\leq k-1$. Let $\overrightarrow{G}_{n,k}$ be the resulting directed shift graph. Note that $\overrightarrow{G}_{n,2}$ is the directed line graph of the transitive tournament corresponding to the identity permutation. Moreover, $\overrightarrow{G}_{n,k+1}$ is the directed line graph of $\overrightarrow{G}_{n,k}$ for all $k \geq 2$.

== Further facts about shift graphs ==
- Odd cycles of $G_{n,k}$ have length at least $2k+1$, in particular $G_{n,2}$ is triangle free.
- For fixed $k \geq 2$ the asymptotic behaviour of the chromatic number of $G_{n,k}$ is given by $\chi(G_{n,k}) = (1 + o(1))\log\log\cdots\log n$ where the logarithm function is iterated ${\displaystyle k-1}$ times.
- Further connections to the chromatic theory of graphs and digraphs have been established in.
- Shift graphs, in particular $G_{n,3}$ also play a central role in the context of order dimension of interval orders.

== Representation of shift graphs ==
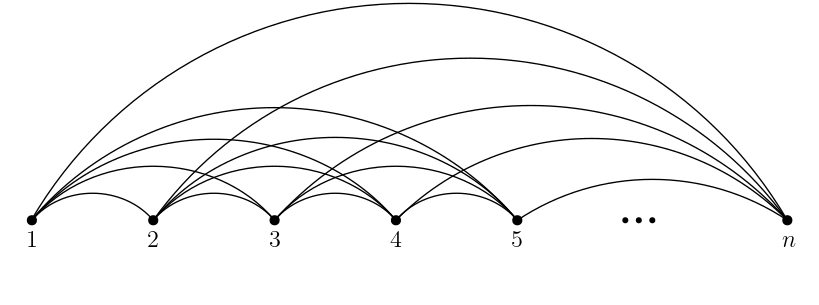
The line representation of a shift graph.

The shift graph $G_{n,2}$ is the line-graph of the complete graph $K_n$ in the following way: Consider the numbers from $1$ to $n$ ordered on the line and draw line segments between every pair of numbers. Every line segment corresponds to the $2$-tuple of its first and last number which are exactly the vertices of $G_{n,2}$. Two such segments are connected if the starting point of one line segment is the end point of the other.
