= Douglas West =

Douglas West may refer to:

- Douglas West (mathematician), American mathematician
- Douglas West (constituency), constituency of the House of Keys, Isle of Man
- Douglas West, a former mining community a mile north-west of Douglas, South Lanarkshire
