= Jack Landau (director) =

American theatre director (1922–1967)

Jack Landau (December 23, 1922, in Braddock, Pennsylvania – March 15, 1967, in Boston, Massachusetts) was an American stage and television director.

== Early life ==
Jack Landau was the youngest of seven children. He had one brother, Hyman Garshin Landau (1909-1966), and five sisters: Lottie Landau Applebaum (1904-1996), Rose Landau Fox (1907-1961), Edith Landau (1914-1942), Sylvia Landau Kasdan (1917-2012), and Jean Landau Glanz (1919-1955). (Sylvia is the mother of screenwriter and director Lawrence Kasdan.) His parents were Lazear "Leonard" Landau (1879-1936) and Anna Stopnitsky Landau (1883-1949), both Polish immigrants. Landau graduated from Peabody High School in Pittsburgh, Pennsylvania, in 1940. He was an active and artistic student, contributing his time to the Masque and Wig Club (President), Palette and Brush Club (President), French Club, Debating Club, and the Stunt Day Committee. He was also a member of the National Honor Society, a reporter for The Civitan (the school's newspaper), and an actor in the school's 1940 play, What A Life. He graduated from St. John's College (Annapolis/Santa Fe) in Annapolis, Maryland, in 1944.

== Early career ==
Landau's first time working on Broadway occurred in April 1944 when he did the lighting design for War President, a play by Nat Sherman. The play, a "drama about [Abraham] Lincoln and his relationships with his Cabinet," was staged at the Shubert Theatre (New York City), and it had only two performances (April 24–25). Landau eventually began doing set design and costume design, working on such plays as A Phoenix Too Frequent and Freight (both one-act plays produced by Stephen H. Scheuer and Bernard Carson in 1950), Mary Rose (produced by Helen Hayes for the ANTA Playhouse in 1951), and Dear Barbarians (starring Cloris Leachman and produced by Gant Gaither in 1952). In 1955, he directed The Carefree Tree, a two-act play by Aldyth Morris performed at the Phoenix Theatre (New York City). Also in 1955, Landau was awarded the Drama Desk Award for Outstanding Director for his work on The Clandestine Marriage and The White Devil.

== The American Shakespeare Festival Theatre and Academy ==
After spending some time in London on the staff of The Old Vic, as well as working on a production of Measure for Measure at Stratford-upon-Avon, Landau's efforts caught the eye of John Houseman, who had been hired as artistic director for the American Shakespeare Festival Theatre and Academy in Stratford, Connecticut, in early 1956. On May 8, 1956, it was announced that Landau would be the new associate director at the Shakespearean establishment. (See American Shakespeare Theatre.) When Houseman resigned his position in August 1959, Landau was appointed as his replacement the following month.

In September 1961, Landau was asked to make a Shakespearean theatrical presentation at The White House at the request of President John F. Kennedy and his wife, Jacqueline Kennedy, to honor a visit from President Ibrahim Abboud of the Sudan. On the evening of Wednesday, October 4, 1961, Landau directed seven of his actors in five scenes from the following plays: Macbeth, Troilus and Cressida, Henry V, As You Like It and The Tempest. It marked the first time Shakespeare had been performed at The White House since 1910, when several actors performed on the south lawn during the Taft administration.

== Death ==
After working as a drama instructor at both Yale University and Boston University, Landau joined the public affairs department of CBS News. In early 1967, he was working as a consultant on a television special for WHDH (Channel 7) in Boston. During the early morning hours of March 15, three teenagers broke into his apartment. Landau, who was clothed in a robe and slippers, was tied up with wire, after which he was beaten, strangled and stabbed. His body was discovered by his agent, David Weiss, on the evening of March 16. Landau's apartment had been ransacked, and several items had been stolen, including his white convertible.

On the evening of March 18, Boston homicide detectives and Revere police officers arrested Michael E. Riley, 19, Eugene G. McKenna, 17, and Frederick Simone, 16, all residents of Revere, for the murder of Jack Landau. Riley and McKenna were charged with murder. Because of his age, Simone was charged with "being a delinquent child by reason of murder" and he was tried in juvenile court. (Years later, Simone would become a capo of the East Boston crew for the Patriarca crime family.) In January 1968, Riley and McKenna were sentenced to life in prison. In February 1969, the Massachusetts Supreme Court overturned the murder convictions because the police did not let the suspects talk with their attorneys while they were being questioned. Since the case would be up for retrial, Riley and McKenna seized the opportunity to strike a plea deal, and they pled guilty to manslaughter, each being sentenced to 12 to 20 years for Landau's death.
