= Homogeneous graph =

The left graph is 3-ultrahomogeneous: For any two of its induced subgraphs that are isomorphic and have at most 3 vertices (an example set of subgraphs labeled red and blue), you can choose any mapping of labels from one to the other that keeps the connections between them the same (ex. vertex 2 to 3, 1 to 4, 0 to 5, keeping 2 connected to 1 and 1 connected to 0). You can then replace one with the other (changing the blue vertices to labels 2, 1 and 0), and then relabel the rest of the graph in a way that maintains the connections of the original graph. The middle graph is 3-homogeneous but not 3-ultrahomogeneous: There exists at least one way to map and replace the vertices of one subgraph with the others and then relabel to make an isomorphic graph (1 to 4, 2 to 3, 5 to 0), but not all subgraph-preserving mappings (1 to 0, 2 to 3, 5 to 4) allow the graph to be relabeled to an automorphism of the original. The right graph is homogeneous: It is k-homogeneous for any subgraph size k. This also make the graph k-ultrahomogeneous for any subgraph size.

In mathematics, a k-ultrahomogeneous graph is a graph in which every isomorphism between two of its induced subgraphs of at most k vertices can be extended to an automorphism of the whole graph. A k-homogeneous graph obeys a weakened version of the same property in which every isomorphism between two induced subgraphs implies the existence of an automorphism of the whole graph that maps one subgraph to the other (but does not necessarily extend the given isomorphism).

A homogeneous graph is a graph that is k-homogeneous for every k, or equivalently k-ultrahomogeneous for every k, and thus, every homogeneous graph is also ultrahomogeneous. It is a special case of a homogenous model.

== Classification ==
The only finite homogeneous graphs are the cluster graphs mK_{n} formed from the disjoint unions of isomorphic complete graphs, the Turán graphs formed as the complement graphs of mK_{n}, the 3 × 3 rook's graph, and the 5-cycle.

The only countably infinite homogeneous graphs are the disjoint unions of isomorphic complete graphs (with the size of each complete graph, the number of complete graphs, or both numbers countably infinite), their complement graphs, the Henson graphs together with their complement graphs, and the Rado graph.

If a graph is 5-ultrahomogeneous, then it is ultrahomogeneous for every k. There are only two connected graphs that are 4-ultrahomogeneous but not 5-ultrahomogeneous: the Schläfli graph and its complement. The proof relies on the classification of finite simple groups.

== Variations ==
A graph is connected-homogeneous if every isomorphism between two connected induced subgraphs can be extended to an automorphism of the whole graph. In addition to the homogeneous graphs, the finite connected connected-homogeneous graphs include all cycle graphs, all square rook's graphs, the Petersen graph, and the 5-regular Clebsch graph.
