= Herbert Grötzsch =

German mathematician (1902–1993)

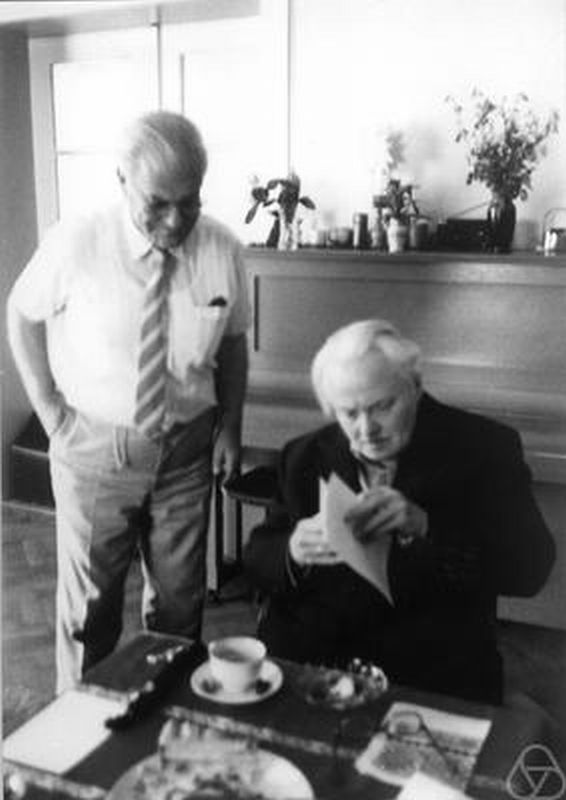
- Herbert Grötzsch (right) on his 86th birthday in Halle, with Horst Tietz
- Born: 21 May 1902; Döbeln, German Empire
- Died: 15 May 1993 (aged 90); Halle, Germany
- Education: University of Leipzig; University of Jena
- Known for: Grötzsch graph Grötzsch's theorem quasiconformal mapping
- Scientific career
- Fields: Mathematics
- Workplaces: Justus Liebig University Giessen; Philipps University of Marburg; Martin Luther University Halle-Wittenberg
- Academic advisors: Paul Koebe
- Notable students: Horst Sachs

Camillo Herbert Grötzsch (21 May 1902 – 15 May 1993) was a German mathematician known primarily for his work on complex analysis, specifically univalent functions and conformal mappings, and graph theory. He was the first to introduce the concept of a quasiconformal mapping. He was the discoverer and eponym of the Grötzsch graph, a triangle-free graph that requires four colors in any graph coloring, and Grötzsch's theorem, the result that every triangle-free planar graph requires at most three colors.

== Biography ==
Camillo Herbert Grötzsch was born in Döbeln in 1902. His father, Emil Camillo Grötzsch, received his doctorate under Sophus Lie and was a mathematics teacher. Grötzsch studied mathematics at the University of Jena from 1922 to 1926 under Paul Koebe. He followed Koebe to the University of Leipzig and received his doctorate there in 1929.

In 1931 Grötzsch obtained his habilitation at the University of Giessen, where he taught until his termination for refusing to join the Sturmabteilung in 1935. he subsequently worked in Leipzig on J. C. Poggendorf's Biographisch-literarisches Handworterbuch zur Geschichte der exacten Wissenschaften until 1939.

During the Second World War, Grötzsch served in the artillery until 1942 and the home service until 1944. In 1944 he worked on jet engine research at the Aerodynamics Research Institute in Göttingen.

After the war, Grötzsch joined at the University of Marburg in 1945. In 1948 he moved to the Martin Luther University Halle-Wittenberg, where he would remain until his retirement in 1967.

Grötzsch was elected to the Leopoldina in 1959. In 1967 he received the National Prize of the German Democratic Republic. The keynote speech in honor of his 75th birthday was given by Lipman Bers.

In 1951 Grötzsch married Annemarie Jung, daughter of mathematician Heinrich Jung; they had three children.

Grötzsch died in Halle in 1993.

The Grötzsch graph

== Publications ==
- Herbert Grötzsch, Über die Verzerrung bei schlichten nicht-konformen Abbildungen und über eine damit zusammenhängende Erweiterung des Picardschen Satzes, Sitzungsberichte sächs. Akad. Wiss., Math.-Phys. Klasse, vol. 80, 1928, pp. 503–507
