= Henson graph =

Infinite graph without small cliques

Unsolved problem in mathematics:
Do the Henson graphs have the finite model property?
(more unsolved problems in mathematics)

In graph theory, the Henson graph G_{i} is an undirected infinite graph, the unique countable homogeneous graph that does not contain an i-vertex clique but that does contain all K_{i}-free finite graphs as induced subgraphs. For instance, G_{3} is a triangle-free graph that contains all finite triangle-free graphs.

These graphs are named after C. Ward Henson, who published a construction for them (for all i ≥ 3) in 1971. The first of these graphs, G_{3}, is also called the homogeneous triangle-free graph or the universal triangle-free graph.

== Construction ==
To construct these graphs, Henson orders the vertices of the Rado graph into a sequence with the property that, for every finite set S of vertices, there are infinitely many vertices having S as their set of earlier neighbors. (Only the Rado graph has such a sequence.) He then defines G_{i} to be the induced subgraph of the Rado graph formed by removing the final vertex (in the sequence ordering) of every i-clique of the Rado graph.

With this construction, each graph G_{i} is an induced subgraph of G_{i + 1}, and the union of this chain of induced subgraphs is the Rado graph itself. Because each graph G_{i} omits at least one vertex from each i-clique of the Rado graph, there can be no i-clique in G_{i}.

== Universality ==
Any finite or countable i-clique-free graph H can be found as an induced subgraph of G_{i} by building it one vertex at a time, at each step adding a vertex whose earlier neighbors in G_{i} match the set of earlier neighbors of the corresponding vertex in H. That is, G_{i} is a universal graph for the family of i-clique-free graphs.

Because there exist i-clique-free graphs of arbitrarily large chromatic number, the Henson graphs have infinite chromatic number. More strongly, if a Henson graph G_{i} is partitioned into any finite number of induced subgraphs, then at least one of these subgraphs includes all i-clique-free finite graphs as induced subgraphs.

== Symmetry ==
Like the Rado graph, G_{3} contains a bidirectional Hamiltonian path such that any symmetry of the path is a symmetry of the whole graph. However, this is not true for G_{i} when i > 3: for these graphs, every automorphism of the graph has more than one orbit.
