= Hereditary property =

Property of objects inherited by all their subobjects

In mathematics, a hereditary property is a property of an object that is inherited by all of its subobjects, where the meaning of subobject depends on the context. These properties are particularly considered in topology and graph theory, but also in set theory.

== In topology ==
In topology, a topological property is said to be hereditary if whenever a topological space has that property, then so does every subspace of it. If the latter is true only for closed subspaces, then the property is called weakly hereditary or closed-hereditary.

For example, second countability and metrisability are hereditary properties. Sequentiality and Hausdorff compactness are weakly hereditary, but not hereditary. Connectivity is not weakly hereditary.

If P is a property of a topological space X and every subspace also has property P, then X is said to be "hereditarily P".

== In combinatorics and graph theory ==
Hereditary properties occur throughout combinatorics and graph theory, although they are known by a variety of names. For example, in the context of permutation patterns, hereditary properties are typically called permutation classes.

=== In graph theory ===
Planarity and bipartiteness are two properties of graphs that are hereditary, because if a graph has either of these properties, then all its induced subgraphs maintain the property.

All subsets of an independent set of a matroid are also independent sets. Independence is therefore a hereditary property.

In graph theory, a hereditary property usually means a property of a graph which also holds for (is "inherited" by) its induced subgraphs. Equivalently, a hereditary property is preserved by the removal of vertices. A graph class $\mathcal{G}$ is called hereditary if it is closed under induced subgraphs. Examples of hereditary graph classes are independent graphs (graphs with no edges), which is a special case (with c = 1) of being c-colorable for some number c, being forests, planar, complete, complete multipartite etc.

Sometimes the term "hereditary" has been defined with reference to graph minors; then it may be called a minor-hereditary property. The Robertson–Seymour theorem implies that a minor-hereditary property may be characterized in terms of a finite set of forbidden minors.

The term "hereditary" has been also used for graph properties that are closed with respect to taking subgraphs. In such a case, properties that are closed with respect to taking induced subgraphs, are called induced-hereditary. The language of hereditary properties and induced-hereditary properties provides a powerful tool for study of structural properties of various types of generalized colourings. The most important result from this area is the unique factorization theorem.

==== Monotone property ====
There is no consensus for the meaning of "monotone property" in graph theory. Examples of definitions are:

- Preserved by the removal of edges.
- Preserved by the removal of edges and vertices (i.e., the property should hold for all subgraphs).
- Preserved by the addition of edges and vertices (i.e., the property should hold for all supergraphs).
- Preserved by the addition of edges. (This meaning is used in the statement of the Aanderaa–Karp–Rosenberg conjecture.)

The complementary property of a property that is preserved by the removal of edges is preserved under the addition of edges. Hence some authors avoid this ambiguity by saying a property A is monotone if A or A^{C} (the complement of A) is monotone. Some authors choose to resolve this by using the term increasing monotone for properties preserved under the addition of some object, and decreasing monotone for those preserved under the removal of the same object.

=== In matroid theory ===
In a matroid, every subset of an independent set is again independent. This is a hereditary property of sets.

A family of matroids may have a hereditary property. For instance, a family that is closed under taking matroid minors may be called "hereditary".

== In problem solving ==
In planning and problem solving, or more formally one-person games, the search space is seen as a directed graph with states as nodes, and transitions as edges. States can have properties, and such a property P is hereditary if for each state S that has P, each state that can be reached from S also has P.

The subset of all states that have P plus the subset of all states that have ~P form a partition of the set of states called a hereditary partition. This notion can trivially be extended to more discriminating partitions by instead of properties, considering aspects of states and their domains. If states have an aspect A, with d_{i} ⊂ D a partition of the domain D of A, then the subsets of states for which A ∈ d_{i} form a hereditary partition of the total set of states iff ∀i, from any state where A ∈ d_{i} only other states where A ∈ d_{i} can be reached.

If the current state and the goal state are in different elements of a hereditary partition, there is no path from the current state to the goal state — the problem has no solution.

Can a checkers board be covered with domino tiles, each of which covers exactly two adjacent fields? Yes. What if we remove the top left and the bottom right field? Then no covering is possible any more, because the difference between number of uncovered white fields and the number of uncovered black fields is 2, and adding a domino tile (which covers one white and one black field) keeps that number at 2. For a total covering the number is 0, so a total covering cannot be reached from the start position.

This notion was first introduced by Laurent Siklóssy and Roach.

== In model theory ==
In model theory and universal algebra, a class K of structures of a given signature is said to have the hereditary property if every substructure of a structure in K is again in K. A variant of this definition is used in connection with Fraïssé's theorem: A class K of finitely generated structures has the hereditary property if every finitely generated substructure is again in K. See age.

== In set theory ==
Recursive definitions using the adjective "hereditary" are often encountered in set theory.

A set is said to be hereditary (or pure) if all of its elements are hereditary sets. It is vacuously true that the empty set is a hereditary set, and thus the set $\{\varnothing\}$ containing only the empty set $\varnothing$ is a hereditary set, and recursively so is $\{\varnothing, \{\varnothing \}\}$, for example. In formulations of set theory that are intended to be interpreted in the von Neumann universe or to express the content of Zermelo–Fraenkel set theory, all sets are hereditary, because the only sort of object that is even a candidate to be an element of a set is another set. Thus the notion of hereditary set is interesting only in a context in which there may be urelements.

A couple of notions are defined analogously:

- A hereditarily finite set is defined as a finite set consisting of zero or more hereditarily finite sets. Equivalently, a set is hereditarily finite if and only if its transitive closure is finite.
- A hereditarily countable set is a countable set of hereditarily countable sets. Assuming the axiom of countable choice, then a set is hereditarily countable if and only if its transitive closure is countable.

Based on the above, it follows that in ZFC a more general notion can be defined for any predicate $\Phi(x)$. A set x is said to have hereditarily the property $\Phi(x)$ if x itself and all members of its transitive closure satisfy $\Phi(y)$, i.e. $x\cup \mathop{\rm tc}(x)\subseteq \{y : \Phi(y)\}$. Equivalently, x hereditarily satisfies $\Phi(x)$ iff it is a member of a transitive subset of $\{y : \Phi(y)\}.$ A property (of a set) is thus said to be hereditary if it is inherited by every subset. For example, being well-ordered is a hereditary property, and so it being finite.

If we instantiate in the above schema $\Phi(x)$ with "x has cardinality less than κ", we obtain the more general notion of a set being hereditarily of cardinality less than κ, usually denoted by $H_\kappa$ or $H(\kappa)$. We regain the two simple notions we introduced above as $H(\omega)$ being the set of hereditarily finite sets and $H(\omega_1)$ being the set of hereditarily countable sets. ($\omega_1$ is the first uncountable ordinal.)
