= Ed Scheinerman =

American mathematician

Edward R. Scheinerman is an American mathematician, working in graph theory and order theory. He is a professor of applied mathematics, statistics, and computer science at Johns Hopkins University. His contributions to mathematics include Scheinerman's conjecture, now proven, stating that every planar graph may be represented as an intersection graph of line segments.

Scheinerman did his undergraduate studies at Brown University, graduating in 1980, and earned his Ph.D. in 1984 from Princeton University under the supervision of Douglas B. West. He joined the Johns Hopkins faculty in 1984, and since 2000 he has been an administrator there, serving as department chair, associate dean, vice dean for education, vice dean for graduate education, and vice dean for faculty (effective September 2019).

He is a two-time winner of the Mathematical Association of America's Lester R. Ford Award for expository writing, in 1991 for his paper "Random intervals" with Joyce Justicz and Peter Winkler, and in 2001 for his paper "When Close is Close Enough". In 1992 he became a fellow of the Institute of Combinatorics and its Applications, and in 2012 he became a fellow of the American Mathematical Society.

== Selected publications ==
Books

- Invitation to Dynamical Systems (Prentice Hall, 1996, reprinted by Dover Publications, 2012).
- Fractional Graph Theory (With Daniel Ullman, Wiley, 1997, reprinted by Dover Publications, 2011).
- Mathematics: A Discrete Introduction. (Brooks/Cole, 2000; 3rd edition, Cengage Learning, 2012).
- C++ for mathematicians : an introduction for students and professionals (Chapman & Hall/CRC, 2006).
- The Mathematics Lover's Companion: Masterpieces for Everyone (Yale University Press, 2017).

Papers

- Scheinerman, E. R. (June 2000), "When close enough is close enough", American Mathematical Monthly, 107 (6): 489–499, doi:10.2307/2589344, JSTOR 2589344.
- Justicz, Joyce; Scheinerman, Edward R.; Winkler, Peter (1990), "Random intervals", American Mathematical Monthly, 97 (10): 881–889, doi:10.2307/2324324, JSTOR 2324324.
