= Gyárfás–Sumner conjecture =

Unsolved problem in mathematics
Does forbidding both a tree and a clique as induced subgraphs produce graphs of bounded chromatic number?
More unsolved problems in mathematics

In graph theory, the Gyárfás–Sumner conjecture says that for any fixed tree $T$, the class of all $T$-free graphs is $\chi$-bounded; that is, every graph that contains neither $T$ nor $K_t$ as an induced subgraph can be properly colored using a constant number of colors, depending only on $T$ and $t$. Equivalently, it says that every $K_t$-free graph $G$ contains any arbitrarily chosen tree $T$ (as an induced subgraph), as long as $\chi(G)$ is large enough. It is named after András Gyárfás and David Sumner, who formulated it independently in 1975 and 1981 respectively. It remains unproven.

In this conjecture, it is not possible to replace $T$ by a graph with cycles. As Paul Erdős and András Hajnal have shown, there exist graphs with arbitrarily large chromatic number and, at the same time, arbitrarily large girth. Using these graphs, one can obtain graphs that avoid any fixed choice of a cyclic graph and clique (of more than two vertices) as induced subgraphs, and exceed any fixed bound on the chromatic number.

The conjecture is known to be true for certain special choices of $T$, including paths, stars, and trees of radius two. It is also known that, for any tree $T$, the graphs that do not contain any subdivision of $T$ are $\chi$-bounded.
