= Joe Celko =

American relational database software engineer

Joe Celko is an American relational database expert from Austin, Texas. He has participated on the ANSI X3H2 Database Standards Committee, and helped write the SQL-89 and SQL-92 standards. He is the author of a Morgan-Kaufmann series of books on SQL, and over 1200 published articles on SQL and other database topics. He had been a full-time statistician for several years.

He is credited with coining the term lasagna code and popularizing Michael J. Kamfonas' nested set model for trees in SQL, a taxonomy of data encoding schemes, and several other design patterns in SQL DDL and DML.

== Early life and education ==
Celko achieved his undergraduate and first master's degrees in math at Georgia State University. He also has a second master's degree in computer science from Georgia Tech.

== Career ==
Celko has a very wide range of industries and applications starting in 1965 with a National Science Fair prize job at the Pittman-Dunn Research labs at the Frankford Arsenal. His public sector consulting work has been for prison systems, medical organizations, NASA and defense contractors. He helped set up programming and Software Engineering standards for the US Army at AIRMICS and wrote regular columns on it in the trade press on Software Engineering.

His commercial consulting work has been varied—auto loans, entertainment, aerospace, education, shipping (freight lines and ocean shipping), petro-chemical, software companies, and odd start-ups.

He has taught training classes in South Africa, Turkey, the UK, Norway, Sweden, Finland, The Netherlands, Brazil, Belgium and Switzerland. He has also created and taught on-line classes for MySQL and SQLUniversity.org. He was part of the founding faculty of Neumont University in Salt Lake City, a for-profit university for software developers.

== Bibliography ==
- Joe Celko's Analytics and OLAP in SQL (Morgan-Kaufmann, 2006) ISBN 978-0-12-369512-3
- Joe Celko's Data and Databases (Morgan Kaufmann, 1999) ISBN 978-1-55860-432-2
- Joe Celko's SQL for Smarties (5th Edition, Morgan-Kaufmann, 2014) ISBN 9780128008300
- Joe Celko's SQL Programming Style (Morgan-Kaufmann, 2005) ISBN 978-0-12-088797-2
- Joe Celko's SQL Puzzles and Answers (2nd edition, Morgan-Kaufmann 2006) ISBN 978-0-12-373596-6
- Joe Celko's Trees and Hierarchies in SQL for Smarties, 2nd Edition (Morgan-Kaufmann, 2012) ISBN 978-0-12-387733-8
- Joe Celko’s Thinking in Sets: Auxiliary, Temporal, and Virtual Tables in SQL. (Morgan-Kaufmann, 2008) ISBN 978-0-12-374137-0
- Joe Celko’s Data, Measurements and Standards in SQL (Morgan-Kaufmann, 2010) ISBN 978-0-12-374722-8
- Joe Celko's Complete Guide to NoSQL (Morgan-Kaufmann, 2014) ISBN 978-0-12-407192-6
