= Grötzsch's theorem =

Every triangle-free planar graph is 3-colorable

A 3-coloring of a triangle-free planar graph

In the mathematical field of graph theory, Grötzsch's theorem is the statement that every triangle-free planar graph can be colored with only three colors. According to the four-color theorem, every graph that can be drawn in the plane without edge crossings can have its vertices colored using at most four different colors, so that the two endpoints of every edge have different colors, but according to Grötzsch's theorem only three colors are needed for planar graphs that do not contain three mutually adjacent vertices.

== History ==
The theorem is named after German mathematician Herbert Grötzsch, who published its proof in 1959. Grötzsch's original proof was complex. Berge (1960) attempted to simplify it but his proof was erroneous.

In 1989, Richard Steinberg and Dan Younger formulated and proved a planar dual version of the theorem: a 3-edge-connected planar graph (or more generally a planar graph with no bridges and at most three 3-edge cuts) has a nowhere-zero 3-flow.

In 2003, Carsten Thomassen derived an alternative proof from another related theorem: every planar graph with girth at least five is 3-list-colorable. However, Grötzsch's theorem itself does not extend from coloring to list coloring: there exist triangle-free planar graphs that are not 3-list-colorable. In 2012, Nabiha Asghar gave a new and much simpler proof of the theorem that is inspired by Thomassen's work.

== Larger classes of graphs ==
A slightly more general result is true: if a planar graph has at most three triangles then it is 3-colorable. However, the planar complete graph $K_4$, and infinitely many other planar graphs containing $K_4$, contain four triangles and are not 3-colorable. In 2009, Dvořák, Kráľ, and Thomas announced a proof of another generalization, conjectured in 1969 by L. Havel: there exists a constant $d$ such that, if a planar graph has no two triangles within distance $d$ of each other, then it can be colored with three colors. This work formed part of the basis for Dvořák's 2015 European Prize in Combinatorics.

The Grötzsch graph, a nonplanar triangle-free graph that is not 3-colorable

The theorem cannot be generalized to all nonplanar triangle-free graphs: not every nonplanar triangle-free graph is 3-colorable. In particular, the Grötzsch graph and the Chvátal graph are triangle-free graphs requiring four colors, and the Mycielskian is a transformation of graphs that can be used to construct triangle-free graphs that require arbitrarily high numbers of colors.

The theorem cannot be generalized to all planar $K_4$-free graphs, either: not every planar graph that requires 4 colors contains $K_4$. In particular, there exists a planar graph without 4-cycles that cannot be 3-colored.

== Factoring through a homomorphism ==
A 3-coloring of a graph $G$ may be described by a graph homomorphism from $G$ to a triangle $K_3$. In the language of homomorphisms, Grötzsch's theorem states that every triangle-free planar graph has a homomorphism to $K_3$. Naserasr showed that every triangle-free planar graph also has a homomorphism to the Clebsch graph, a 4-chromatic graph. By combining these two results, it may be shown that every triangle-free planar graph has a homomorphism to a triangle-free 3-colorable graph, the tensor product of $K_3$ with the Clebsch graph. The coloring of the graph may then be recovered by composing this homomorphism with the homomorphism from this tensor product to its $K_3$ factor. However, the Clebsch graph and its tensor product with $K_3$ are both non-planar; there does not exist a triangle-free planar graph to which every other triangle-free planar graph may be mapped by a homomorphism.

== Geometric representation ==
A result of de Castro et al. (2002) combines Grötzsch's theorem with Scheinerman's conjecture on the representation of planar graphs as intersection graphs of line segments. They proved that every triangle-free planar graph can be represented by a collection of line segments, with three slopes, such that two vertices of the graph are adjacent if and only if the line segments representing them cross. A 3-coloring of the graph may then be obtained by assigning two vertices the same color whenever their line segments have the same slope.

== Computational complexity ==
Given a triangle-free planar graph, a 3-coloring of the graph can be found in linear time.
