= Universal graph =

In mathematics, a universal graph is an infinite graph that contains every finite (or at-most-countable) graph as an induced subgraph. A universal graph of this type was first constructed by Richard Rado and is now called the Rado graph or random graph. More recent work has focused on universal graphs for a graph family F: that is, an infinite graph belonging to F that contains all finite graphs in F. For instance, the Henson graphs are universal in this sense for the i-clique-free graphs.

An infinite path is a universal graph for the family of path graphs.

A universal graph for a family F of graphs can also refer to a member of a sequence of finite graphs that contains all graphs in F; for instance, every finite tree is a subgraph of a sufficiently large hypercube graph so a hypercube can be said to be a universal graph for trees. However it is not the smallest such graph: it is known that there is a universal graph for n-vertex trees, with only n vertices and O(n log n) edges, and that this is optimal. A construction based on the planar separator theorem can be used to show that n-vertex planar graphs have universal graphs with O(n^{3/2}) edges, and that bounded-degree planar graphs have universal graphs with O(n log n) edges. It is also possible to construct universal graphs for planar graphs that have n^{1+o(1)} vertices. Sumner's conjecture states that tournaments are universal for polytrees, in the sense that every tournament with 2n − 2 vertices contains every polytree with n vertices as a subgraph.

A family F of graphs has a universal graph of polynomial size, containing every n-vertex graph as an induced subgraph, if and only if it has an adjacency labelling scheme in which vertices may be labeled by O(log n)-bit bitstrings such that an algorithm can determine whether two vertices are adjacent by examining their labels. For, if a universal graph of this type exists, the vertices of any graph in F may be labeled by the identities of the corresponding vertices in the universal graph, and conversely if a labeling scheme exists then a universal graph may be constructed having a vertex for every possible label.

In older mathematical terminology, the phrase "universal graph" was sometimes used to denote a complete graph.

The notion of universal graph has been adapted and used for solving mean payoff games.
