= András Gyárfás =

Hungarian mathematician

András Gyárfás (born 18 August 1945) is a Hungarian mathematician who specializes in the study of graph theory. He is famous for two conjectures:

- Together with Paul Erdős he conjectured what is now called the Erdős–Gyárfás conjecture which states that any graph with minimum degree 3 contains a cycle whose length is a power of two.
- He and David Sumner independently formulated the Gyárfás–Sumner conjecture according to which, for every tree T, the T-free graphs are χ-bounded.

Gyárfás began working as a researcher for the Computer and Automation Research Institute of the Hungarian Academy of Sciences in 1968. He earned a candidate degree in 1980, and a doctorate (Dr. Math. Sci.) in 1992. He won the Géza Grünwald Commemorative Prize for young researchers of the János Bolyai Mathematical Society in 1978. He was co-author with Paul Erdős on 15 papers, and thus has Erdős number one.
