= Discrete Mathematics (journal) =

- Discipline: Mathematics
- Language: English
- Edited by: Douglas B. West

Publication details
- History: 1971–present
- Publisher: North-Holland Publishing Company
- Frequency: 24/year
- Impact factor: 0.87 (2020)

Standard abbreviations
- ISO 4: Discrete Math.

Indexing
- CODEN: DSMHA4
- ISSN: 0012-365X
- LCCN: 72621801
- OCLC no.: 471516939

Links
- Journal homepage; Online archive

Discrete Mathematics is a biweekly peer-reviewed scientific journal in the broad area of discrete mathematics, combinatorics, graph theory, and their applications. It was established in 1971 and is published by North-Holland Publishing Company. It publishes both short notes, full length contributions, as well as survey articles. In addition, the journal publishes a number of special issues each year dedicated to a particular topic. Although originally it published articles in French and German, it now allows only English language articles. The editor-in-chief is Douglas West (University of Illinois, Urbana).

== History ==
The journal was established in 1971. The first article it published was written by Paul Erdős, who went on to publish a total of 84 papers in the journal.

== Abstracting and indexing ==
The journal is abstracted and indexed in:

- ACM Computing Reviews
- Cambridge Scientific Abstracts
- Current Contents/Physics, Chemical, & Earth Sciences
- International Abstracts in Operations Research
- Mathematical Reviews
- PASCAL
- Science Citation Index
- Zentralblatt MATH
- Scopus

According to the Journal Citation Reports, the journal has a 2020 impact factor of 0.87.
