= Hereditary set =

Concept in mathematical logic

In set theory, a hereditary set (or pure set) is a set whose elements are all hereditary sets. That is, all elements of the set are themselves sets, as are all elements of the elements, and so on.

== Examples ==
For example, it is vacuously true that the empty set is a hereditary set, and thus the set $\{\varnothing\}$ containing only the empty set $\varnothing$ is a hereditary set. Similarly, a set $\{\varnothing,\{\varnothing\} \}$ that contains two elements: the empty set and the set that contains only the empty set, is a hereditary set.

== In formulations of set theory ==
In formulations of set theory that are intended to be interpreted in the von Neumann universe or to express the content of Zermelo–Fraenkel set theory, all sets are hereditary, because the only sort of object that is even a candidate to be an element of a set is another set. Thus the notion of hereditary set is interesting only in a context in which there may be urelements.

== Assumptions ==
The inductive definition of hereditary sets presupposes that set membership is well-founded (i.e., the axiom of regularity), otherwise the recurrence may not have a unique solution. However, it can be restated non-inductively as follows: a set is hereditary if and only if its transitive closure contains only sets. In this way the concept of hereditary sets can also be extended to non-well-founded set theories in which sets can be members of themselves. For example, a set that contains only itself is a hereditary set.

== See also ==
- Hereditarily countable set
- Hereditarily finite set
- Well-founded set
