= Mycielskian =

Derived graph of higher chromatic number

In the mathematical area of graph theory, the Mycielskian or Mycielski graph of an undirected graph is a larger graph formed from it by a construction of Jan Mycielski (1955). The construction preserves the property of being triangle-free but increases the chromatic number; by applying the construction repeatedly to a triangle-free starting graph, Mycielski showed that there exist triangle-free graphs with arbitrarily large chromatic number.

== Construction ==
Mycielskian construction applied to a 5-cycle graph, producing the Grötzsch graph with 11 vertices and 20 edges, the smallest triangle-free 4-chromatic graph (Chvátal 1974).

Let the n vertices of the given graph G be v_{1}, v_{2}, . . . , v_{n}. The Mycielski graph μ(G) contains G itself as a subgraph, together with n+1 additional vertices: a vertex u_{i} corresponding to each vertex v_{i} of G, and an extra vertex w. Each vertex u_{i} is connected by an edge to w, so that these vertices form a subgraph in the form of a star K_{1,n}. In addition, for each edge v_{i}v_{j} of G, the Mycielski graph includes two edges, u_{i}v_{j} and v_{i}u_{j}.

Thus, if G has n vertices and m edges, μ(G) has 2n+1 vertices and 3m+n edges.

The only new triangles in μ(G) are of the form v_{i}v_{j}u_{k}, where v_{i}v_{j}v_{k} is a triangle in G. Thus, if G is triangle-free, so is μ(G).

To see that the construction increases the chromatic number $\chi(G)=k$, consider a proper k-coloring of $\mu(G){-}\{w\}$; that is, a mapping $c : \{v_1,\ldots,v_n,u_1,\ldots,u_n\}\to \{1,2,\ldots,k\}$ with $c(x)\neq c(y)$ for adjacent vertices x,y. If we had $c(u_i)\in \{1,2,\ldots,k{-}1\}$ for all i, then we could define a proper (k−1)-coloring of G by $c'\!(v_i) = c(u_i)$ when $c(v_i) = k$, and $c'\!(v_i) = c(v_i)$ otherwise. But this is impossible for $\chi(G)=k$, so c must use all k colors for $\{u_1,\ldots,u_n\}$, and any proper coloring of the last vertex w must use an extra color. That is, $\chi(\mu(G))=k{+}1$.

== Iterated Mycielskians ==
M_{2}, M_{3} and M_{4} Mycielski graphs

Applying the Mycielskian repeatedly, starting with the one-edge graph, produces a sequence of graphs M_{i} = μ(M_{i−1}), sometimes called the Mycielski graphs. The first few graphs in this sequence are the graph M_{2} = K_{2} with two vertices connected by an edge, the cycle graph M_{3} = C_{5}, and the Grötzsch graph M_{4} with 11 vertices and 20 edges.

In general, the graph M_{i} is triangle-free, (i−1)-vertex-connected, and i-chromatic. The number of vertices in M_{i} for i ≥ 2 is 3 × 2^{i−2} − 1 (sequence A083329 in the OEIS), while the number of edges for i ≥ 2 is $\frac{1}{2}\left(7 \times 3^{i-2} + 1\right) - 3 \times 2^{i-2}$, which begins as:

1, 5, 20, 71, 236, 755, 2360, 7271, 22196, 67355, ... (sequence A122695 in the OEIS).

== Properties ==
Hamiltonian cycle in M_{4} (Grötzsch graph)

- If G has chromatic number k, then μ(G) has chromatic number k + 1 (Mycielski 1955).
- If G is triangle-free, then so is μ(G) (Mycielski 1955).
- More generally, if G has clique number ω(G), then μ(G) has clique number of the maximum among 2 and ω(G). (Mycielski 1955)
- If G is a factor-critical graph, then so is μ(G) (Došlić 2005). In particular, every graph M_{i} for i ≥ 2 is factor-critical.
- If G has a Hamiltonian cycle, then so does μ(G) (Fisher, McKenna & Boyer 1998).
- If G has domination number γ(G), then μ(G) has domination number γ(G)+1 (Fisher, McKenna & Boyer 1998).

== Cones over graphs ==
A generalized Mycielskian, formed as a cone over the 5-cycle, Δ_{3}(C_{5}) = Δ_{3}(Δ_{2}(K_{2})).

A generalization of the Mycielskian, called a cone over a graph, was introduced by Stiebitz (1985) and further studied by Tardif (2001) and Lin et al. (2006). In this construction, one forms a graph $\Delta_i(G)$ from a given graph G by taking the tensor product G × H, where H is a path of length i with a self-loop at one end, and then collapsing into a single supervertex all of the vertices associated with the vertex of H at the non-loop end of the path. The Mycielskian itself can be formed in this way as μ(G) = Δ_{2}(G).

While the cone construction does not always increase the chromatic number, Stiebitz (1985) proved that it does so when applied iteratively to K_{2}. That is, define a sequence of families of graphs, called generalized Mycielskians, as

ℳ(2) = {K_{2}} and ℳ(k+1) = {$\Delta_i(G)$ | G ∈ ℳ(k), i ∈ $\mathbb{N}$}.

For example, ℳ(3) is the family of odd cycles. Then each graph in ℳ(k) is k-chromatic. The proof uses methods of topological combinatorics developed by László Lovász to compute the chromatic number of Kneser graphs. The triangle-free property is then strengthened as follows: if one only applies the cone construction Δ_{i} for i ≥ r, then the resulting graph has odd girth at least 2r + 1, that is, it contains no odd cycles of length less than 2r + 1. Thus generalized Mycielskians provide a simple construction of graphs with high chromatic number and high odd girth.
