= H. G. Landau =

American mathematical biologist, statistician and sociologist

- Born: Hyman Garshin Landau; December 18, 1909; Chmelnik, Poland
- Died: December 2, 1966 (aged 56); Chicago, USA
- Education: Carnegie Institute of Technology (BS, MS); University of Pittsburgh (PhD)
- Scientific career
- Workplaces: Ballistic Research Laboratory; University of Chicago; Columbia University

Hyman Garshin Landau (December 18, 1909 – December 2, 1966), more often known as H. G. Landau, was an American mathematical biologist, statistician and sociologist who is known for using mathematical methods such as graph theory to understand animal behavior and social dynamics. After receiving his doctorate in statistics from the University of Pittsburgh, he worked at the Ballistic Research Laboratory at Aberdeen Proving Ground, Maryland, while teaching part-time at the University of Delaware. He carried out his seminal work on graph tournaments as a research associate at the University of Chicago. Later, he moved to Columbia University, again as a research associate, after being forced to leave Chicago by the House Un-American Activities Committee.
