= Douglas West (mathematician) =

American mathematician (born 1953)

- Born: 1953 (age 72–73)
- Education: Princeton University
- Scientific career
- Fields: Mathematics (graph theory)
- Workplaces: University of Illinois at Urbana-Champaign
- Doctoral advisor: Daniel Kleitman
- Doctoral students: Ed Scheinerman

Douglas Brent West is a professor of graph theory at University of Illinois at Urbana-Champaign. He received his Ph.D. from Massachusetts Institute of Technology in 1978; his advisor was Daniel Kleitman. He is the "W" in G. W. Peck, a pseudonym for a group of six mathematicians that includes West. He is the editor of the journal Discrete Mathematics.

== Selected work ==
=== Books ===
- Introduction to Graph Theory - Second edition, Douglas B. West. Published by Prentice Hall 1996, 2001. ISBN 0-13-014400-2
- Mathematical Thinking: Problem-Solving and Proofs Second edition, John P D'Angelo and Douglas West. Published by Prentice Hall 1999. ISBN 0-13-014412-6
- Combinatorial Mathematics Douglas B. West. Published by Cambridge University Press 2020. ISBN 1-107-05858-9

=== Research work ===
- Spanning trees with many leaves, DJ Kleitman, DB West - SIAM Journal on Discrete Mathematics, 1991.
- Class of Solutions to the Gossip Problem, Part II, DB West - Discrete Mathematics, 1982.
- The interval number of a planar graph: three intervals suffice, ER Scheinerman, DB West - Journal of combinatorial theory. Series B, 1983.

== See also ==
- Erdős–Gallai theorem
- Necklace splitting problem
