= Hereditarily countable set =

In set theory, a set is called hereditarily countable if it is a countable set of hereditarily countable sets.

== Results ==
The inductive definition above is well-founded and can be expressed in the language of first-order set theory.

=== Equivalent properties ===
A set is hereditarily countable if and only if it is countable, and every element of its transitive closure is countable.

=== The collection of all hereditarily countable sets ===
The class of all hereditarily countable sets can be proven to be a set from the axioms of Zermelo–Fraenkel set theory (ZF) and is set is designated $H_{\aleph_1}$. In particular, the existence does not require any form of the axiom of choice. Constructive Zermelo–Fraenkel (CZF) does not prove the class to be a set.

The set $H_{\aleph_1}$ is included in the set $V_{\omega_1}$ from the von Neumann hierarchy, that is, $H_{\aleph_1} \subseteq V_{\omega_1}$. Every hereditarily finite set is hereditarily countable, so $H_{\aleph_1} \supseteq \mathrm{HF} = V_{\omega}$. Since $V_{\omega}$ is countable, we in fact have $H_{\aleph_1} \supseteq V_{\omega+1}$.

An ordinal is hereditarily countable if and only if it is countable.

==== Model theory ====
This class is a model of Kripke–Platek set theory with the axiom of infinity (KPI), if the axiom of countable choice is assumed in the metatheory.

If $x \in H_{\aleph_1}$, then $L_{\omega_1}(x) \subseteq H_{\aleph_1}$.

== Generalizations ==
More generally, a set is hereditarily of cardinality less than κ if it is of cardinality less than κ, and all its elements are hereditarily of cardinality less than κ. The class of all such sets can also be proven to be a set from the axioms of ZF, and is designated $H_\kappa \!$. If the axiom of choice holds and the cardinal κ is regular, then a set is hereditarily of cardinality less than κ if and only if its transitive closure is of cardinality less than κ.

== See also ==
- Hereditarily finite set
- Constructible universe
