= Triangle-free graph =

Graph without triples of adjacent vertices

In the mathematical area of graph theory, a triangle-free graph is an undirected graph in which no three vertices form a triangle of edges. Triangle-free graphs may be equivalently defined as graphs with clique number ≤ 2, graphs with girth ≥ 4, graphs with no induced 3-cycle, or locally independent graphs.

The triangle-free graphs with the most edges for their vertices are balanced complete bipartite graphs. Many triangle-free graphs are not bipartite, for example any cycle graph C_{n} for odd n > 3.

By Turán's theorem, the n-vertex triangle-free graph with the maximum number of edges is a complete bipartite graph in which the numbers of vertices on each side of the bipartition are as equal as possible.

== Triangle finding problem ==
The triangle finding or triangle detection problem is the problem of determining whether a graph is triangle-free or not. When the graph does contain a triangle, algorithms are often required to output three vertices which form a triangle in the graph.

It is possible to test whether a graph with $m$ edges is triangle-free in time $\tilde O\bigl(m^{2\omega/(\omega+1)}\bigr)$ where the $\tilde O$ hides sub-polynomial factors. Here $\omega$ is the exponent of fast matrix multiplication; $\omega<2.372$ from which it follows that triangle detection can be solved in time $O(m^{1.407})$. Another approach is to find the trace of A^{3}, where A is the adjacency matrix of the graph. The trace is zero if and only if the graph is triangle-free. For dense graphs, it is more efficient to use this simple algorithm which again relies on matrix multiplication, since it gets the time complexity down to $O(n^{\omega})$, where $n$ is the number of vertices.

Even if matrix multiplication algorithms with time $O(n^2)$ were discovered, the best time bounds that could be hoped for from these approaches are $O(m^{4/3})$ or $O(n^2)$. In fine-grained complexity, the sparse triangle hypothesis is an unproven computational hardness assumption asserting that no time bound of the form $O(m^{4/3-\delta})$ is possible, for any $\delta>0$, regardness of what algorithmic techniques are used. It, and the corresponding dense triangle hypothesis that no time bound of the form $O(n^{\omega-\delta})$ is possible, imply lower bounds for several other computational problems in combinatorial optimization and computational geometry.

As Imrich, Klavžar & Mulder (1999) showed, triangle-free graph recognition is equivalent in complexity to median graph recognition; however, the current best algorithms for median graph recognition use triangle detection as a subroutine rather than vice versa.

The decision tree complexity or query complexity of the problem, where the queries are to an oracle which stores the adjacency matrix of a graph, is Θ(n^{2}). However, for quantum algorithms, the best known lower bound is Ω(n), but the best known algorithm is O(n^{5/4}).

== Independence number and Ramsey theory ==
An independent set of $\lfloor\sqrt{n}\rfloor$ vertices (where $\lfloor\cdot\rfloor$ is the floor function) in an n-vertex triangle-free graph is easy to find: either there is a vertex with at least $\lfloor\sqrt{n}\rfloor$ neighbors (in which case those neighbors are an independent set) or all vertices have strictly less than $\lfloor\sqrt{n}\rfloor$ neighbors (in which case any maximal independent set must have at least $\lfloor\sqrt{n}\rfloor$ vertices). This bound can be tightened slightly: in every triangle-free graph there exists an independent set of $\Omega(\sqrt{n\log n})$ vertices, and in some triangle-free graphs every independent set has $O(\sqrt{n\log n})$ vertices. One way to generate triangle-free graphs in which all independent sets are small is the triangle-free process in which one generates a maximal triangle-free graph by repeatedly adding randomly chosen edges that do not complete a triangle. With high probability, this process produces a graph with independence number $O(\sqrt{n\log n})$. It is also possible to find regular graphs with the same properties.

These results may also be interpreted as giving asymptotic bounds on the Ramsey numbers R(3,t) of the form $\Theta(\tfrac{t^2}{\log t})$: if the edges of a complete graph on $\Omega(\tfrac{t^2}{\log t})$ vertices are colored red and blue, then either the red graph contains a triangle or, if it is triangle-free, then it must have an independent set of size t corresponding to a clique of the same size in the blue graph.

== Coloring triangle-free graphs ==
The Grötzsch graph is a triangle-free graph that cannot be colored with fewer than four colors

Much research about triangle-free graphs has focused on graph coloring. Every bipartite graph (that is, every 2-colorable graph) is triangle-free, and Grötzsch's theorem states that every triangle-free planar graph may be 3-colored. However, nonplanar triangle-free graphs may require many more than three colors.

The first construction of triangle-free graphs with arbitrarily high chromatic number is due to Tutte (writing as Blanche Descartes). This construction started from the graph with a single vertex say $G_1$ and inductively constructed $G_{k+1}$ from $G_{k}$ as follows: let $G_{k}$ have $n$ vertices, then take a set $Y$ of $k(n-1)+1$ vertices and for each subset $X$ of $Y$ of size $n$ add a disjoint copy of $G_{k}$ and join it to $X$ with a matching. From the pigeonhole principle it follows inductively that $G_{k+1}$ is not $k$ colourable, since at least one of the sets $X$ must be coloured monochromatically if we are only allowed to use k colours. Mycielski (1955) defined a construction, now called the Mycielskian, for forming a new triangle-free graph from another triangle-free graph. If a graph has chromatic number k, its Mycielskian has chromatic number k + 1, so this construction may be used to show that arbitrarily large numbers of colors may be needed to color nonplanar triangle-free graphs. In particular the Grötzsch graph, an 11-vertex graph formed by repeated application of Mycielski's construction, is a triangle-free graph that cannot be colored with fewer than four colors, and is the smallest graph with this property. Gimbel & Thomassen (2000) and Nilli (2000) showed that the number of colors needed to color any m-edge triangle-free graph is

$$O \left(\frac{m^{1/3}}{(\log m)^{2/3}} \right)$$

and that there exist triangle-free graphs that have chromatic numbers proportional to this bound.

There have also been several results relating coloring to minimum degree in triangle-free graphs. Andrásfai, Erdős & Sós (1974) proved that any n-vertex triangle-free graph in which each vertex has more than 2n/5 neighbors must be bipartite. This is the best possible result of this type, as the 5-cycle requires three colors but has exactly 2n/5 neighbors per vertex. Motivated by this result, Erdős & Simonovits (1973) conjectured that any n-vertex triangle-free graph in which each vertex has at least n/3 neighbors can be colored with only three colors; however, Häggkvist (1981) disproved this conjecture by finding a counterexample in which each vertex of the Grötzsch graph is replaced by an independent set of a carefully chosen size. Jin (1995) showed that any n-vertex triangle-free graph in which each vertex has more than 10n/29 neighbors must be 3-colorable; this is the best possible result of this type, because Häggkvist's graph requires four colors and has exactly 10n/29 neighbors per vertex. Finally, Brandt & Thomassé (2006) proved that any n-vertex triangle-free graph in which each vertex has more than n/3 neighbors must be 4-colorable. Additional results of this type are not possible, as Hajnal found examples of triangle-free graphs with arbitrarily large chromatic number and minimum degree (1/3 − ε)n for any ε > 0.

== See also ==
- Andrásfai graph, a family of triangle-free circulant graphs with diameter two
- Henson graph, an infinite triangle-free graph that contains all finite triangle-free graphs as induced subgraphs
- Shift graph, a family of triangle-free graphs with arbitrarily high chromatic number
- The Kneser graph $KG_{3k-1, k}$ is triangle-free and has chromatic number $k + 1$
- Monochromatic triangle problem, the problem of partitioning the edges of a given graph into two triangle-free graphs
- Ruzsa–Szemerédi problem, on graphs in which every edge belongs to exactly one triangle
