= Cubicity =

Graph invariant defined from axis-parallel unit cubes

A graph with cubicity 2, realized as the intersection graph of axis-parallel unit 2-cubes, i.e. axis-parallel unit squares, in the plane.

In the mathematical field of graph theory, cubicity is a graph invariant defined to be the smallest dimension such that a graph can be realized as the intersection graph of axis-parallel unit cubes in Euclidean space. Cubicity was introduced by Fred S. Roberts in 1969, along with a related invariant called boxicity that considers the smallest dimension needed to represent a graph as the intersection graph of axis-parallel rectangles in Euclidean space.

An indifference graph with cubicity 1, realized as the intersection graph of unit 1-cubes, i.e. unit intervals, on the real number line.

== Definition ==
This article only considers simple, undirected graphs, with finite and non-empty vertex sets.

The cubicity of a graph $G$, denoted by $\operatorname{cub}(G)$, is the smallest integer $k$ such that $G$ can be represented as the intersection graph of axis-parallel closed unit $k$-cubes in $k$-dimensional Euclidean space, $\mathrm{E}^k$.

For $k \geq 1$, a graph $G$ can have such a representation in $\mathrm{E}^k$ if and only if $G$ is the intersection of $k$ indifference graphs on the same vertex set as $G$.

The cubicity of a complete graph is defined to be zero.

== Relations to certain graph classes, upper bound ==
For a graph $G$, $\operatorname{cub}(G) = 0$ if and only if $G$ is complete.

For a graph $G$, $\operatorname{cub}(G) = 1$ if and only if $G$ is a unit interval graph that is not complete.

For $n \in \N^*$, $\operatorname{cub}(K_{1,n}) = \lfloor \log_2 (2n-1) \rfloor$, where $K_{1,n}$ denotes the star graph, a tree with one internal vertex and $n$ leaves, and where $\lfloor \cdot \rfloor$ denotes the floor function.

For $p \in \N^*$, $\operatorname{cub}(K_{p(2)}) = p$, where $K_{p(2)}$ denotes the complete multipartite graph with $p$ parts of cardinal $2$.

For a graph $G$ on $n$ vertices, $\operatorname{cub}(G) \leq \lfloor 2n/3 \rfloor$. Moreover, this upper bound is best possible in terms of $n$.

== Relations to other graph dimensions ==
=== Relations to boxicity: bounds ===
The cubicity of a graph $G$ is closely related to its boxicity, denoted by $\operatorname{box}(G).$ The definition of boxicity is essentially the same as that of cubicity, but with axis-parallel boxes instead of axis-parallel unit cubes.

Since a cube is a special case of a box, the cubicity of a graph $G$ is always an upper bound for its boxicity, i.e., $~ \operatorname{box}(G) \leq \operatorname{cub}(G).$

In the other direction, it can be shown that for a graph $G$ on $n$ vertices, $~ \operatorname{cub}(G) \leq \lceil \log_2 n \rceil \operatorname{box}(G), ~$ where $\lceil \cdot \rceil$ denotes the ceiling function. Moreover, this upper bound is tight.

=== Relations to sphericity ===
The sphericity of a graph $G,$ denoted by $\operatorname{sph}(G),$ is defined in the same way as cubicity but with congruent spheres instead of axis-parallel unit cubes.

For certain graphs, cubicity exceeds sphericity; the five-pointed star, $K_{1,5},$ is an example: $~ \operatorname{cub}(K_{1,5}) = 3 > \operatorname{sph}(K_{1,5}) = 2.$

In the other direction, graphs $G$ can be constructed so that $~ \operatorname{sph}(G) > \operatorname{cub}(G) = k, ~$ for $k \in \{ 2,3 \}.$
