= Smith graph =

Type of graph in graph theory

In the mathematical field of graph theory, a Smith graph is either of two kinds of graph.

- It is a graph whose adjacency matrix has largest eigenvalue at most 2, or has spectral radius 2 or at most 2. The graphs with spectral radius 2 form two infinite families and three sporadic examples; if we ask for spectral radius at most 2 then there are two additional infinite families and three more sporadic examples. The infinite families with spectral radius less than 2 are the paths and the paths with one extra edge attached to the vertex next to an endpoint; the infinite families with spectral radius exactly 2 are the cycles and the paths with an extra edge attached to each of the vertices next to an endpoint.

These are also the simply laced affine (and finite, if the spectral radius may be less than 2) Dynkin diagrams.

- It is a strongly regular graph with certain kinds of parameter values.
