= Coenraad Bron =

Dutch computer scientist (1937–2006)

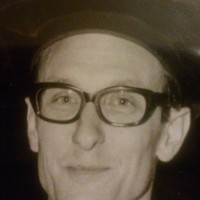
- Bron in 1972
- Education: Utrecht University
- Scientific career
- Fields: Computer science
- Workplaces: Eindhoven University, Twente University, Groningen University,

Coenraad Bron (2 August 1937 – 15 August 2006) was a Dutch computer scientist. He worked with Edsger W. Dijkstra on the THE multiprogramming system. Together with Joep Kerbosch he invented the Bron–Kerbosch algorithm for the clique problem.

Born in Amsterdam, Bron read Chemistry at Utrecht University. After his graduation he moved to Eindhoven University where he started to work in Dijkstra's group. In 1972 he accepted an assistant professorship in Computing Science at Twente University, becoming a full professor there in 1980.

He died in Assen at age 69.
