= Modular product of graphs =

Binary operation in graph theory

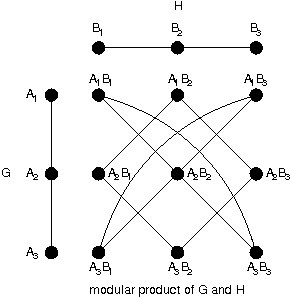
The modular product of graphs.

In graph theory, the modular product of graphs G and H is a graph formed by combining G and H that has applications to subgraph isomorphism. It is one of several different kinds of graph products that have been studied, generally using the same vertex set (the Cartesian product of the sets of vertices of the two graphs G and H) but with different rules for determining which edges to include.

== Definition ==
The vertex set of the modular product of G and H is the cartesian product V(G) × V(H). Any two vertices (u, v) and (u' , v' ) are adjacent in the modular product of G and H if and only if u is distinct from u', v is distinct from v', and either

- u is adjacent with u' and v is adjacent with v', or
- u is not adjacent with u' and v is not adjacent with v'.

== Application to subgraph isomorphism ==
Cliques in the modular product graph correspond to isomorphisms of induced subgraphs of G and H. Therefore, the modular product graph can be used to reduce problems of induced subgraph isomorphism to problems of finding cliques in graphs. Specifically, the maximum common induced subgraph of both G and H corresponds to the maximum clique in their modular product. Although the problems of finding largest common induced subgraphs and of finding maximum cliques are both NP-complete, this reduction allows clique-finding algorithms to be applied to the common subgraph problem.
