= Simple path =

Simple path may refer to:

- Simple curve, a continuous injective function from an interval in the set of real numbers $\R$ to $\R^n$ or more generally to a metric space or a topological space
- Simple path (graph theory), a simple path is a path in a graph which does not have repeating vertices
