= Fred S. Roberts =

American mathematician

Fred Stephen Roberts (born June 19, 1943) is an American mathematician, a professor of mathematics at Rutgers University, and a former director of DIMACS.

== Biography ==
Roberts did his undergraduate studies at Dartmouth College, and received his Ph.D. from Stanford University in 1968; his doctoral advisor was Dana Scott. After holding positions at the University of Pennsylvania, RAND, and the Institute for Advanced Study, he joined the Rutgers faculty in 1972.

He has been vice president of the Society for Industrial and Applied Mathematics twice, in 1984 and 1986, and has been director of DIMACS since 1996.

== Research ==
Roberts' research concerns graph theory and combinatorics, and their applications in modeling problems in the social sciences and biology. Among his contributions to pure mathematics, he is known for introducing the concept of boxicity, the minimum dimension needed to represent a given undirected graph as an intersection graph of axis-parallel boxes.

== Books ==
Roberts is the author or co-author of the following books:

- Discrete Mathematical Models, with Applications to Social, Biological and Environmental Problems, Prentice-Hall, 1976, ISBN 978-0-13-214171-0. Russian translation, Nauka, 1986.
- Graph Theory and its Applications to the Problems of Society, CBMS-NSF Regional Conference Series in Applied Mathematics 29, SIAM, 1987, ISBN 978-0-89871-026-7.
- Measurement Theory, with Applications to Decisionmaking, Utility, and the Social Sciences, Encyclopedia of Mathematics and its Applications 7, Addison-Wesley, 1979, ISBN 978-0-201-13506-0. Reprinted by Cambridge University Press, 2009.
- Applied Combinatorics, Prentice-Hall, 1984. 2nd edition (with B. Tesman), 2004, ISBN 978-0-13-079603-5. 3rd edition, Chapman & Hall, 2009. Chinese translation, Pearson Education Asia, 2005 and 2007.

He is also the editor of nearly 20 edited volumes.

== Awards and honors ==
Roberts received the ACM SIGACT Distinguished Service Prize in 1999. In 2001, he won the National Science Foundation Science and Technology Centers Pioneer Award for "pioneering the science and technology center concept". In 2003, DIMACS held a Conference on Applications of Discrete Mathematics and Theoretical Computer Science, in honor of Roberts' 60th birthday. In 2012 he became a fellow of the American Mathematical Society.
