= Maximum common subgraph =

In graph theory and theoretical computer science, a maximum common subgraph may mean either:

- Maximum common induced subgraph, a graph that is an induced subgraph of two given graphs and has as many vertices as possible
- Maximum common edge subgraph, a graph that is a subgraph of two given graphs and has as many edges as possible
