= Sphericity (graph theory) =

A graph with sphericity 2: A space graph of the vertices of a pentagon, realized as the intersection graph of the unit 2-disks in the plane, centered on these points. This is also known as a unit disk graph.

In the mathematical field of graph theory, the sphericity of a graph is a graph invariant defined to be the smallest dimension of Euclidean space required to realize the graph as the intersection graph of congruent spheres. The sphericity of a graph is one of several notions of graph dimension based on intersection graphs; others include boxicity and cubicity. The concept of sphericity was first introduced by Hiroshi Maehara in 1980 (and also used by Timothy F. Havel in 1982).

== Definitions ==
This article only considers undirected graphs, with finite and non-empty vertex sets, with no loop and no multiple edge.

The sphericity of a graph $G$, denoted by $\operatorname{sph}(G)$, is the smallest integer $k \geq 0$ such that $G$ can be realized as the intersection graph of closed unit-diameter spheres, in the $k$-dimensional Euclidean space, $\mathbb{R}^k$.

Sphericity can also be defined using the language of space graphs as follows. For a finite set of points in the $k$-dimensional Euclidean space, a space graph $\mathbb G$ is built by connecting pairs of points with a line segment if and only if their Euclidean distance is less than some specified constant (called the adjacency limit of $\mathbb G$).
Then, the sphericity of a graph $G$ is the minimum integer $k \geq 0$ such that $G$ is isomorphic to a space graph in $\mathbb{R}^k$. Indeed: A space graph in $k$-space is, as an abstract graph, nothing but the intersection graph of a family of equiradial $k$-disks in $k$-space. Remark: Maehara takes these disks to be open. (The final result is the same.)

A space graph with sphericity 1, formed from a set of points on the real number line, by connecting pairs of points whose distance is at most 1. Also the intersection graph of the set of unit 1-disks, i.e. unit intervals, centered on the points.

Graphs of sphericity $1$ are known as unit interval graphs or indifference graphs. Graphs of sphericity $2$ are known as unit disk graphs.

== Values on certain graph classes, bounds ==
The sphericity on certain graph classes can be computed exactly. The following sphericities were given by Maehara in his original paper on the topic ($n$ denotes the graph order).

Graph	Description	Sphericity	Note
$K_1$	Complete graph	$0$	
$K_n$	Complete graph	$1$	$n > 1$
$P_n$	Path graph	$1$	$n > 1$
$C_n$	Circuit graph	$2$	$n > 3$
$K_{p(2)}$	Complete multipartite graph on $p$ parts of cardinal $2$	$2$	$p > 1.$

However, Fishburn claims that $\operatorname{cub}(G) = \operatorname{sph}(G) = 0$ if and only if $G$ is a complete graph (where $\operatorname{cub}(G)$ denotes the cubicity of $G$; by convention, $0$-space is the singleton $\{ 0 \}$ and any (closed) $0$-disk = any (closed) $0$-cube = $\{ 0 \}$), and that $\operatorname{cub}(G) = \operatorname{sph}(G) = 1$ if and only if $G$ is a unit interval graph that is not complete. Indeed, his definition of cubicity / sphericity allows adjacent distinct vertices with same closed neighborhood to be assigned the same cube / sphere.

The following sphericities were given by Maehara in his paper on semiregular polyhedra.

Graph of polyhedron	Description	Sphericity	Note	Ref.
$A_m$	$m$-Antiprism	$2$	$m \geq 3$	
$P_m$	$m$-Prism	$2$	$m = 3$ or $m \geq 10$	
$P_m$	$m$-Prism	$3$	$m = 5$ or $m = 6$	
$C, D, I$	Cube, regular dodecahedron, regular icosahedron	$3$		
	Archimedean solid	$3$		

Maehara conjectured that the graphs of the $7$-prism, $8$-prism, and $9$-prism have sphericity $3$.

The most general upper bound on sphericity that is known is as follows:
If a graph $G$ is not complete, then $\operatorname{sph}(G) \leq |G| - \mathbb{\text{ω}}(G)$,
where $|G|$ and $\mathbb{\text{ω}}(G)$ respectively denote the order and the clique number of $G$.

For certain graphs, a slightly smaller upper bound is known:
If $G$ is a split graph and $|G| - \mathbb{\mbox{ω}}(G) > 2$, then $\operatorname{sph}(G) \leq |G| - \mathbb{\mbox{ω}}(G) - 1$.

For every positive integer $m$, there exists a split graph $G$ such that $\operatorname{sph}(G) = |G| - \mathbb{\text{ω}}(G) - 1 = m$.

For $1 \leq m \leq n$, $~ \operatorname{sph}(K_{m,n}) \leq m - 1 + \lceil n/2 \rceil$, where $K_{m,n}$ denotes the complete bipartite graph with part cardinals $m$ and $n$.
