= DIMACS =

Center for Discrete Mathematics and Theoretical Computer Science at Rutgers University

The Center for Discrete Mathematics and Theoretical Computer Science (DIMACS) is a collaboration between Rutgers University, Princeton University, and the research firms AT&T, Bell Labs, Applied Communication Sciences, and NEC. It was founded in 1989 with money from the National Science Foundation. Its offices are located on the Rutgers campus, and 250 members from the six institutions form its permanent members.

DIMACS is devoted to both theoretical development and practical applications of discrete mathematics and theoretical computer science. It engages in a wide variety of evangelism including encouraging, inspiring, and facilitating researchers in these subject areas, and sponsoring conferences and workshops.

Fundamental research in discrete mathematics has applications in diverse fields including Cryptology, Engineering, Networking, and Management Decision Support.

Past directors have included Fred S. Roberts, Daniel Gorenstein, András Hajnal, and Rebecca N. Wright.

== The DIMACS challenges ==
DIMACS sponsors implementation challenges to determine practical algorithm performance on problems of interest. DIMACS lists thirteen implementation challenges, including the 13th challenge, Network Flows 2.0, for 2027:

- 1990−1991: Network flows and matching
- 1992−1992: NP-hard problems: Max Clique, Graph Coloring, and SAT
- 1993−1994: Parallel algorithms for combinatorial problems
- 1994−1995: Computational biology: fragment assembly and genome rearrangement
- 1995−1996: Priority queues, dictionaries, and multidimensional point sets
- 1998−1998: Near-neighbor searches
- 2000−2000: Semidefinite and related optimization problems
- 2001−2001: The traveling salesman problem
- 2005−2005: The shortest-path problem
- 2011−2012: Graph partitioning and graph clustering
- 2013−2014: Steiner tree problems
- 2020−2021: Vehicle routing problems
- 2027: Network Flows 2.0
