= Worst-case analysis =

The worst-case analysis regulation was promulgated in 1979 by the US Council on Environmental Quality (CEQ). The regulation is one of many implementing the National Environmental Policy Act of 1969 and it sets out the formal procedure a US government agency must follow when confronted with gaps in relevant information or scientific uncertainty about significant adverse effects on the environment from a major federal action.

== Synopsis ==
The regulation requires an agency to make known when it is confronted with gaps in relevant information or scientific uncertainty. The agency then must determine if the missing information is essential to a reasoned choice among the alternatives. When the missing information is material to the decision an agency ordinarily must obtain the information and include it in an environmental impact statement (EIS). If the means for obtaining the missing information are beyond the state of the art or alternatively if the costs of obtaining it are exorbitant the agency must then prepare a worst-case analysis. In this analysis the agency must weigh the need for the action against the risks and in the face of uncertainty. The agency also is to indicate the probability or improbability of the worst case's occurrence.
