= Shortest-path graph =

The shortest-path graph with t = 2

In mathematics and geographic information science, a shortest-path graph is an undirected graph defined from a set of points in the Euclidean plane. The shortest-path graph is proposed with the idea of inferring edges between a point set such that the shortest path taken over the inferred edges will roughly align with the shortest path taken over the imprecise region represented by the point set. The edge set of the shortest-path graph varies based on a single parameter t ≥ 1. When the weight of an edge is defined as its Euclidean length raised to the power of the parameter t ≥ 1, the edge is present in the shortest-path graph if and only if it is the least weight path between its endpoints.

== Properties of shortest-path graph ==
When the configuration parameter t goes to infinity, shortest-path graph become the minimum spanning tree of the point set. The graph is a subgraph of the point set's Gabriel graph and therefore also a subgraph of its Delaunay triangulation.
