= Snake-in-the-box =

Computational problem in graph theory

Drawing of a snake in a cube (which is a three-dimensional hypercube)

Unsolved problem in mathematics
What is the maximum length of a snake for each n-dimensional hypercube graph?
More unsolved problems in mathematics

The snake-in-the-box problem in graph theory and coding theory deals with finding a certain kind of path along the edges of a hypercube. This path starts at one corner and travels along the edges to as many corners as it can reach. After it gets to a new corner, the previous corner and all of its neighbors must be marked as unusable. The path must never travel to a corner which has been marked unusable.

In other words, a snake is a connected open path in the hypercube where each node has exactly two neighbors that are also in the path, with the exception of the first and last nodes, which each has only one neighbor in the path. The rule for generating a snake is that a node in the hypercube may be visited if it is connected to the current node and it is not a neighbor of any previously visited node in the snake, other than the current node.

In graph theory terminology, this is called finding the longest possible induced path in a hypercube; it can be viewed as a special case of the induced subgraph isomorphism problem. There is a similar problem of finding long induced cycles in hypercubes, called the coil-in-the-box problem.

The snake-in-the-box problem was first described by Kautz (1958), motivated by the theory of error-correcting codes. The vertices of a solution to the snake or coil in the box problems can be used as a Gray code that can detect single-bit errors. Such codes have applications in electrical engineering, coding theory, and computer network topologies. In these applications, it is important to devise as long a code as is possible for a given dimension of hypercube. Often, the longer the code, the more effective are its capabilities.

Finding the longest snake or coil becomes notoriously difficult as the dimension number increases and the search space suffers a serious combinatorial explosion. Some techniques for determining the upper and lower bounds for the snake-in-the-box problem include proofs using discrete mathematics and graph theory, exhaustive search of the search space, and heuristic search utilizing evolutionary techniques.

== Known lengths and bounds ==
Maximum lengths of snakes (L_{s}) and coils (L_{c}) in the snakes-in-the-box problem for dimensions n from 1 to 4

The maximum length for the snake-in-the-box problem is known for dimensions one through eight; it is

1, 2, 4, 7, 13, 26, 50, 98 (sequence A099155 in the OEIS).

Beyond that length, the exact length of the longest snake is not known; the best lengths found so far for dimensions nine through thirteen are

191, 379, 746, 1476, 2932.

For cycles (the coil-in-the-box problem), a cycle cannot exist in a hypercube of dimension less than two. The maximum lengths of the longest possible cycles are

0, 4, 6, 8, 14, 26, 48, 96 (sequence A000937 in the OEIS).

Beyond that length, the exact length of the longest cycle is not known; the best lengths found so far for dimensions nine through thirteen are

192, 374, 738, 1468, 2840.

Doubled coils are a special case: cycles whose second half repeats the structure of their first half, also known as symmetric coils. For dimensions two through seven the lengths of the longest possible doubled coils are

4, 6, 8, 14, 26, 46.

Beyond that, the best lengths found so far for dimensions eight through thirteen are

94, 186, 370, 726, 1430, 2810.

For both the snake and the coil in the box problems, it is known that the maximum length is proportional to 2^{n} for an n-dimensional box, asymptotically as n grows large, and bounded above by 2^{n − 1}. The constant of proportionality is not known, the best known lower bound being 77/256 ≈ 0.30 (see Abbot & Katchalski (1991)).
