= Hyperrectangle =

Generalization of a rectangle for higher dimensions

Hyperrectangle Orthotope
- A rectangular cuboid is a 3-orthotope
- Type: Prism
- Faces: 2n
- Edges: n × 2^{n−1}
- Vertices: 2^{n}
- Schläfli symbol: {}×{}×···×{} = {}^{n}
- Coxeter diagram: ···
- Symmetry group: [2^{n−1}], order 2^{n}
- Dual polyhedron: Rectangular n-fusil
- Properties: convex, zonohedron, isogonal

Projections of $k$-cells onto the plane (from $k\in\{1,\dots{},6\}$). Only the edges of the higher-dimensional cells are shown.

In geometry, a hyperrectangle (also called a box, hyperbox, $k$-cell or orthotope), is the generalization of a rectangle (a plane figure) and the rectangular cuboid (a solid figure) to higher dimensions. A necessary and sufficient condition is that it is congruent to the Cartesian product of finite intervals. This means that a $k$-dimensional rectangular solid has each of its edges equal to one of the closed intervals used in the definition. Every $k$-cell is compact.

If all of the edges are equal length, it is a hypercube. A hyperrectangle is a special case of a parallelotope.

== Formal definition ==
For every integer $i$ from $1$ to $k$, let $a_i$ and $b_i$ be real numbers such that $a_i < b_i$. The set of all points $x=(x_1,\dots,x_k)$ in $\mathbb{R}^k$ whose coordinates satisfy the inequalities $a_i\leq x_i\leq b_i$ is a $k$-cell.

== Intuition ==
A $k$-cell of dimension $k\leq 3$ is especially simple. For example, a 1-cell is simply the interval $[a,b]$ with $a < b$. A 2-cell is the rectangle formed by the Cartesian product of two closed intervals, and a 3-cell is a rectangular solid.

The sides and edges of a $k$-cell need not be equal in (Euclidean) length; although the unit cube (which has boundaries of equal Euclidean length) is a 3-cell, the set of all 3-cells with equal-length edges is a strict subset of the set of all 3-cells.

== Types ==
A four-dimensional orthotope is likely a hypercuboid.

The special case of an n-dimensional orthotope where all edges have equal length is the n-cube or hypercube.

By analogy, the term "hyperrectangle" can refer to Cartesian products of orthogonal intervals of other kinds, such as ranges of keys in database theory or ranges of integers, rather than real numbers.

== Dual polytope ==
n-fusil
- Example: 3-fusil
- Type: Prism
- Faces: 2n
- Vertices: 2^{n}
- Schläfli symbol: {}+{}+···+{} = n{}
- Coxeter diagram: ...
- Symmetry group: [2^{n−1}], order 2^{n}
- Dual polyhedron: n-orthotope
- Properties: convex, isotopal

The dual polytope of an n-orthotope has been variously called a rectangular n-orthoplex, rhombic n-fusil, or n-lozenge. It is constructed by 2n points located in the center of the orthotope rectangular faces.

An n-fusil's Schläfli symbol can be represented by a sum of n orthogonal line segments: { } + { } + ... + { } or n{ }.

A 1-fusil is a line segment. A 2-fusil is a rhombus. Its plane cross selections in all pairs of axes are rhombi.

n	Example image
1	Line segment { }
2	Rhombus { } + { } = 2{ }
3	Rhombic 3-orthoplex inside 3-orthotope { } + { } + { } = 3{ }

== See also ==
- Minimum bounding rectangle
- Cuboid
- Hilbert cube
