= Edge and vertex spaces =

Vertex space for 3 vertex graphs, or edge space for 3 edge graphs.

In the mathematical discipline of graph theory, the edge space and vertex space of an undirected graph are vector spaces defined in terms of the edge and vertex sets, respectively. These vector spaces make it possible to use techniques of linear algebra in studying the graph.

== Definition ==
Let $G:=(V,E)$ be a finite undirected graph. The vertex space $\mathcal{V}(G)$ of G is the vector space over the finite field of two elements $\mathbb{Z}/2\mathbb{Z}:=\lbrace 0,1 \rbrace$ of all functions $V\rightarrow \mathbb{Z}/2\mathbb{Z}$. Every element of $\mathcal{V}(G)$ naturally corresponds the subset of V which assigns a 1 to its vertices. Also every subset of V is uniquely represented in $\mathcal{V}(G)$ by its characteristic function. The edge space $\mathcal{E}(G)$ is the $\mathbb{Z}/2\mathbb{Z}$-vector space freely generated by the edge set E. The dimension of the vertex space is thus the number of vertices of the graph, while the dimension of the edge space is the number of edges.

These definitions can be made more explicit. For example, we can describe the edge space as follows:

- elements are subsets of $E$, that is, as a set $\mathcal{E}(G)$ is the power set of E
- vector addition is defined as the symmetric difference: $P+Q := P \triangle Q \qquad P,Q \in \mathcal{E}(G)$
- scalar multiplication is defined by:
  - $0 \cdot P := \emptyset \qquad P \in \mathcal{E}(G)$
  - $1 \cdot P := P \qquad P \in \mathcal{E}(G)$

The singleton subsets of E form a basis for $\mathcal{E}(G)$.

One can also think of $\mathcal{V}(G)$ as the power set of V made into a vector space with similar vector addition and scalar multiplication as defined for $\mathcal{E}(G)$.

== Properties ==
The incidence matrix $H$ for a graph $G$ defines one possible linear transformation

$$H:\mathcal{E}(G) \to \mathcal{V}(G)$$

between the edge space and the vertex space of $G$. The incidence matrix of $G$, as a linear transformation, maps each edge to its two incident vertices. Let $vu$ be the edge between $v$ and $u$ then

$$H(vu) = v+u$$

The cycle space and the cut space are subspaces of the edge space.

== See also ==
- Cycle space
- Cut space
