= T. C. Hu =

Taiwanese-American computer scientist

Te Chiang Hu (Chinese: 胡德强, 1930–2021) was a Chinese-American computer scientist and operations researcher known for his work in the design and analysis of algorithms. His contributions to network flow problems included the representation of all pairwise flows using the Gomory–Hu tree,^{[GH61]} the formulation of the multi-commodity flow problem,^{[H63]} and a textbook on flow problems.^{[HY69]} He also published highly cited algorithms for scheduling tree-structured tasks,^{[H61a]} the widest path problem,^{[H61b]} optimal binary search trees,^{[HT71]} linear layouts of trees and graphs,^{[AH73]} minimum routing cost spanning trees,^{[H74]} and the matrix chain multiplication problem.^{[HS82]}

== Early life and education ==
Hu's family came from Zhejiang province, China but Hu was born in Beijing in 1930 and lived under the Japanese occupation during the Second World War. Later, he moved to Taiwan in the late 1940s as part of the retreat of the Republic of China to Taiwan following the defeat of the Kuomintang in the Chinese Civil War. He studied engineering at National Taiwan University, graduating with a bachelor's degree in 1953. He moved to the United States for graduate study, first earning a master's degree in 1956 at the University of Illinois Urbana-Champaign, and then completing a Ph.D. in 1960 at Brown University. His doctoral dissertation, Optimum design for structures of perfectly-plastic materials, was supervised by Richard Thorpe Shield.

== Career and later life ==
After completing his doctorate, Hu worked for IBM Research from 1960 to 1966, also including consulting at the RAND Corporation. It was during this period that he did much of his early work on network flow, including the development of the Gomory–Hu tree with Ralph E. Gomory.^{[GH61]} In 1966, he took a faculty position at the University of Wisconsin–Madison, and in 1968 was named full professor of computer science. He published his book on network flow in 1969.^{[HY69]}

In 1974 he moved to the University of California, San Diego, initially in the Applied Electro-Physics Department and later becoming a founding member of the Department of Computer Science and Engineering. The Mathematics Genealogy Project lists eight doctoral students of Hu there, including Frank Ruskey. He published another textbook on algorithms in 1982,^{[H82]} and worked on the matrix chain multiplication problem with his student M. T. Shing (later added as a coauthor to his algorithms text) in the early 1980s.^{[HS82]} He returned to the topic of his dissertation, the optimal design of surfaces, with a 1992 paper on finding minimal surfaces with nonzero thickness using network flow,^{[HKR92]} and won a best-paper award for a 1995 paper on circuit partitioning.^{[L+95]} He retired in 2007, but continued publishing research; one of his last publications was a book on linear programming with another of his students, Andrew Kahng.^{[HK16]}

He died in October 2021.

== Recognition ==
Hu was elected as a Fellow of the Institute for Operations Research and the Management Sciences (INFORMS) in 2013. A special session of the 2018 International Symposium on Physical Design commemorated his contributions to the field.

== Selected works ==
=== Research papers ===
H61a.	Hu, T. C. (1961), "Parallel sequencing and assembly line problems", Operations Research, 9 (6): 841–848, doi:10.1287/opre.9.6.841, JSTOR 167050, MR 0135614

H61b.	Hu, T. C. (1961), "The maximum capacity route problem", Operations Research, 9 (6): 898–900, doi:10.1287/opre.9.6.898, JSTOR 167055

GH61.	Gomory, R. E.; Hu, T. C. (1961), "Multi-terminal network flows", Journal of the Society for Industrial and Applied Mathematics, 9 (4): 551–570, doi:10.1137/0109047, MR 0135624

H63.	Hu, T. C. (June 1963), "Multi-commodity network flows", Operations Research, 11 (3): 344–360, doi:10.1287/opre.11.3.344, JSTOR 168023

HT71.	Hu, T. C.; Tucker, A. C. (1971), "Optimal computer search trees and variable-length alphabetical codes", SIAM Journal on Applied Mathematics, 21 (4): 514–532, doi:10.1137/0121057, MR 0304063

AH73.	Adolphson, D.; Hu, T. C. (1973), "Optimal linear ordering", SIAM Journal on Applied Mathematics, 25 (3): 403–423, doi:10.1137/0125042, MR 0345618

H74.	Hu, T. C. (1974), "Optimum communication spanning trees", SIAM Journal on Computing, 3 (3): 188–195, doi:10.1137/0203015, MR 0427116

HS82.	Hu, T.-C.; Shing, M.-T. (1982), "Computation of matrix chain products, I", SIAM Journal on Computing, 11 (2): 362–373, doi:10.1137/0211028, MR 0652909; ——; —— (1984), "Computation of matrix chain products, II", SIAM Journal on Computing, 13 (2): 228–251, doi:10.1137/0213017, MR 0739987

HKR92.	Hu, T. C.; Kahng, A. B.; Robins, G. (October 1992), "Solution of the discrete Plateau problem", Proceedings of the National Academy of Sciences, 89 (19): 9235–9236, Bibcode:1992PNAS...89.9235H, doi:10.1073/pnas.89.19.9235, PMC 50100, PMID 11607330

L+95.	Liu, Lung-Tien; Kuo, Ming-Ter; Cheng, Chung-Kuan; Hu, T.C. (May 1995), "A replication cut for two-way partitioning", IEEE Transactions on Computer-Aided Design of Integrated Circuits and Systems, 14 (5): 62–630, Bibcode:1995ITCAD..14..623L, doi:10.1109/43.384426

=== Books ===
HY69.	Hu, T. C.; Young, R. D. (1969), Integer Programming and Network Flows, Reading, Massachusetts: Addison-Wesley, MR 0263420

H82.	Hu, T. C. (1982), Combinatorial Algorithms, Addison-Wesley, ISBN 9780201038590; 2nd ed., with Man-Tak Shing, Dover, 2002

HK16.	Hu, T. C.; Kahng, Andrew B. (2016), Linear and Integer Programming Made Easy, Springer International Publishing, doi:10.1007/978-3-319-24001-5, ISBN 9783319240015
