= Upset =

Upset may refer to:

- Upset (band), an American rock band
- Upset (competition), where a likely winner loses
- "Upset" (Hit the Floor), an episode of the television series Hit the Floor
- Upset (horse), a racehorse
- Upset (wastewater treatment), temporarily decreased effluent quality
- Aircraft upset, a dangerous aviation condition
- Upper set, in mathematics
- UpSet Plot, in data visualization
- Upset forging, a forging process where a workpiece's diameter is increased by compressing its length.
- Upset, a type of fault in wood, see Shakes (timber) § Thunder shake or upset
