= Ruskey =

Ruskey may refer to:

- Frank Ruskey, combinatorialist and computer scientist
- Roosky, a village in counties Leitrim and Roscommon, Ireland
