= Veblen's theorem =

Theorem in graph theory

In mathematics, Veblen's theorem, introduced by Oswald Veblen (1912), states that the set of edges of a finite graph can be written as a union of disjoint simple cycles if and only if every vertex has even degree. Thus, it is closely related to the theorem of Euler (1736) that a finite graph has an Euler tour (a single non-simple cycle that covers the edges of the graph) if and only if it is connected and every vertex has even degree. Indeed, a representation of a graph as a union of simple cycles may be obtained from an Euler tour by repeatedly splitting the tour into smaller cycles whenever there is a repeated vertex. However, Veblen's theorem applies also to disconnected graphs, and can be generalized to infinite graphs in which every vertex has finite degree.

If a countably infinite graph G has no odd-degree vertices, then it may be written as a union of disjoint (finite) simple cycles if and only if every finite subgraph of G can be extended (by including more edges and vertices from G) to a finite Eulerian graph. In particular, every countably infinite graph with only one end and with no odd vertices can be written as a union of disjoint cycles.

== See also ==
- Cycle basis
- Cycle double cover conjecture
- Eulerian matroid
