= Matrix chain multiplication =

Mathematics optimization problem

Matrix chain multiplication (or the matrix chain ordering problem) is an optimization problem concerning the most efficient way to multiply a given sequence of matrices. The problem is not actually to perform the multiplications, but merely to decide the sequence of the matrix multiplications involved. The problem may be solved using dynamic programming.

There are many options because matrix multiplication is associative. In other words, no matter how the product is parenthesized, the result obtained will remain the same. For example, for four matrices A, B, C, and D, there are five possible options:

((AB)C)D = (A(BC))D = (AB)(CD) = A((BC)D) = A(B(CD)).

Although it does not affect the product, the order in which the terms are parenthesized affects the number of simple arithmetic operations needed to compute the product, that is, the computational complexity. The straightforward multiplication of a matrix that is X × Y by a matrix that is Y × Z requires XYZ ordinary multiplications and X(Y − 1)Z ordinary additions. In this context, it is typical to use the number of ordinary multiplications as a measure of the runtime complexity.

If A is a 10 × 30 matrix, B is a 30 × 5 matrix, and C is a 5 × 60 matrix, then

computing (AB)C needs (10×30×5) + (10×5×60) = 1,500 + 3,000 = 4,500 operations, while
computing A(BC) needs (30×5×60) + (10×30×60) = 9,000 + 18,000 = 27,000 operations.

Clearly the first method is more efficient. With this information, the problem statement can be refined as "how to determine the optimal parenthesization of a product of n matrices?" The number of possible parenthesizations is given by the (n–1)^{th} Catalan number, which is Θ(4^{n} / n^{3/2}), so checking each possible parenthesization (brute force) would require a run-time that is exponential in the number of matrices, which is very slow and impractical for large n. A quicker solution to this problem can be achieved by breaking up the problem into a set of related subproblems.

== A dynamic programming algorithm ==
To begin, let us assume that all we really want to know is the minimum cost, or minimum number of arithmetic operations needed to multiply out the matrices. If we are only multiplying two matrices, there is only one way to multiply them, so the minimum cost is the cost of doing this. In general, we can find the minimum cost using the following recursive algorithm:

- Take the sequence of matrices and separate it into two subsequences.
- Find the minimum cost of multiplying out each subsequence.
- Add these costs together, and add in the cost of multiplying the two result matrices.
- Do this for each possible position at which the sequence of matrices can be split, and take the minimum over all of them.

For example, if we have four matrices ABCD, we compute the cost required to find each of (A)(BCD), (AB)(CD), and (ABC)(D), making recursive calls to find the minimum cost to compute ABC, AB, CD, and BCD. We then choose the best one. Better still, this yields not only the minimum cost, but also demonstrates the best way of doing the multiplication: group it the way that yields the lowest total cost, and do the same for each factor.

However, this algorithm has exponential runtime complexity making it as inefficient as the naive approach of trying all permutations. The reason is that the algorithm does a lot of redundant work. For example, above we made a recursive call to find the best cost for computing both ABC and AB. But finding the best cost for computing ABC also requires finding the best cost for AB. As the recursion grows deeper, more and more of this type of unnecessary repetition occurs.

One simple solution is called memoization: each time we compute the minimum cost needed to multiply out a specific subsequence, we save it. If we are ever asked to compute it again, we simply give the saved answer, and do not recompute it. Since there are about n^{2}/2 different subsequences, where n is the number of matrices, the space required to do this is reasonable. It can be shown that this simple trick brings the runtime down to O(n^{3}) from exponential, which is more than efficient enough for real applications. This is top-down dynamic programming.

The following bottom-up approach computes, for each 2 ≤ k ≤ n, the minimum costs of all subsequences of length k using the costs of smaller subsequences already computed. It has the same asymptotic runtime and requires no recursion.

Pseudocode:

// Matrix A[i] has dimension dims[i-1] x dims[i] for i = 1..n
MatrixChainOrder(int dims[])
{
    // length[dims] = n + 1
    n = dims.length - 1;
    // m[i,j] = Minimum number of scalar multiplications (i.e., cost)
    // needed to compute the matrix A[i]A[i+1]...A[j] = A[i..j]
    // The cost is zero when multiplying one matrix
    for (i = 1; i <= n; i++)
        m[i, i] = 0;

    for (len = 2; len <= n; len++) { // Subsequence lengths
        for (i = 1; i <= n - len + 1; i++) {
            j = i + len - 1;
            m[i, j] = MAXINT;
            for (k = i; k <= j - 1; k++) {
                cost = m[i, k] + m[k+1, j] + dims[i-1]*dims[k]*dims[j];
                if (cost < m[i, j]) {
                    m[i, j] = cost;
                    s[i, j] = k; // Index of the subsequence split that achieved minimal cost
                }
            }
        }
    }
}

- Note: The first index for dims is 0 and the first index for m and s is 1.

A Python implementation using the memoization decorator from the standard library:

from functools import cache

def matrix_chain_order(dims: list[int]) -> int:
    @cache
    def a(i, j):
        return min(
            (a(i, k) + dims[i] * dims[k] * dims[j] + a(k, j) for k in range(i + 1, j)),
            default=0,
        )

    return a(0, len(dims) - 1)

== More efficient algorithms ==
There are algorithms that are more efficient than the O(n^{3}) dynamic programming algorithm, though they are more complex.

All are based on an equivalence (or reduction) between multiplication of n matrices, and triangulation of an n+1-sided regular polygon. The former consists of adding n−1 (correctly nested) pairs of parentheses to the product to give an order of evaluation, while the latter consists of adding n−2 non-intersecting internal edges to partition the polygon into n−1 triangles. In each case, the number of ways this can be done is C_{n−1}, the (n−1)-th Catalan number.

If the input matrices have dimensions w_{i−1}×w_{i}, we can construct an n+1-sided polygon whose vertices V_{0} through V_{n} are labelled with the corresponding dimensions w_{0} through w_{n}. Each edge represents a matrix whose dimensions are the weights of its two endpoints: the n input matrices, and the final w_{0}×w_{n} product. For the purpose of visualization, imagine the final edge is the horizontal base at the bottom of the polygon, with the input matrices arranged clockwise above it.

A triangulation adds internal edges so that only triangles remain. Each triangle represents a multiplication which is performed, and each internal edge represents an intermediate product which is computed. The triangle including the base is the final product, and its two other edges are the multiplicands, which may be intermediate products at the bases of their own smaller polygons.

For the example below, there are four sides: A, B, C and the final result ABC. A is a 10×30 matrix, B is a 30×5 matrix, C is a 5×60 matrix, and the final result is a 10×60 matrix. The regular polygon for this example is a 4-gon, i.e. a square:

The matrix product AB is a 10×5 matrix and BC is a 30×60 matrix. The two possible triangulations in this example are:

Polygon representation of (AB)C

Polygon representation of A(BC)

The cost of a single triangle in terms of the number of multiplications needed is the product of its vertices. The total cost of a particular triangulation of the polygon is the sum of the costs of all its triangles:

(AB)C: (10×30×5) + (10×5×60) = 1,500 + 3,000 = 4,500 multiplications
A(BC): (30×5×60) + (10×30×60) = 9,000 + 18,000 = 27,000 multiplications

The following 14 triangulations of a regular hexagon correspond to the 14 different ways that parentheses can be placed to order the multiplications for a product of 5 matrices.

=== Hu & Shing ===
T. C. Hu and M.-T. Shing developed an algorithm which finds an optimum solution for the minimum cost partition problem in O(n log n) time. Their proof of correctness of the algorithm relies on "Lemma 1" proved in a 1981 technical report and omitted from the published paper. The technical report's proof of the lemma is incorrect, but Shing has presented a corrected proof.

=== Other O(n log n) algorithms ===
Wang, Zhu and Tian have published a simplified O(n log m) algorithm, where n is the number of matrices in the chain and m is the number of local minimums in the dimension sequence of the given matrix chain. That is, the number of positions at which w_{i} < w_{i−1} and w_{i} < w_{i+1} (subscripts computed modulo n+1).

=== Chin-Hu-Shing approximate solution ===
An algorithm created independently by Chin and Hu & Shing runs in O(n) and produces a parenthesization which is at most 15.47% worse than the optimal choice. In most cases the algorithm yields the optimal solution or a solution which is only 1–2 percent worse than the optimal one.

The algorithm considers groups of three consecutive vertices $V_{i-1}, V_i, V_{i+1}$, along with the vertex $V_\min$ with minimum weight $w_\min$. We look at the quadrilateral with vertices $V_\min, V_{i-1}, V_i, V_{i+1}$ (in clockwise order). We can triangulate it in two ways:

- $(V_\min, V_{i-1}, V_i)$ and $(V_\min, V_{i+1}, V_i)$, with cost $w_{\min}w_{i-1}w_i+w_{\min}w_{i+1}w_i$
- $(V_\min, V_{i-1}, V_{i+1})$ and $(V_{i-1}, V_i, V_{i+1})$ with cost $w_{\min}w_{i-1}w_{i+1}+w_{i-1}w_{i}w_{i+1}$.

If the latter is cheaper than the former, that is if

$$w_{\min}w_{i-1}w_{i+1}+w_{i-1}w_{i}w_{i+1} < w_{\min}w_{i-1}w_i+w_{\min}w_{i+1}w_i$$

or equivalently

$$\frac{1}{w_i}+\frac{1}{w_\min} < \frac{1}{w_{i+1}}+\frac{1}{w_{i-1}}$$

we remove the vertex $V_i$ from the polygon and add the side $(V_{i-1}, V_{i+1})$ to the triangulation. We repeat this process until no $V_i$ satisfies the condition above. For all the remaining vertices $V_i$, we add the side $(V_\min, V_i)$ to the triangulation. This gives us a nearly optimal triangulation.

== Generalizations ==
The matrix chain multiplication problem generalizes to solving a more abstract problem: given a linear sequence of objects, an associative binary operation on those objects, and a way to compute the cost of performing that operation on any two given objects (as well as all partial results), compute the minimum cost way to group the objects to apply the operation over the sequence. A practical instance of this comes from the ordering of join operations in databases; see Query optimization § Join ordering.

Another somewhat contrived special case of this is string concatenation of a list of strings. In C, for example, the cost of concatenating two strings of length m and n using strcat is O(m + n), since we need O(m) time to find the end of the first string and O(n) time to copy the second string onto the end of it. Using this cost function, we can write a dynamic programming algorithm to find the fastest way to concatenate a sequence of strings. However, this optimization is rather useless because we can straightforwardly concatenate the strings in time proportional to the sum of their lengths. A similar problem exists for singly linked lists.

Another generalization is to solve the problem when parallel processors are available. In this case, instead of adding the costs of computing each factor of a matrix product, we take the maximum because we can do them simultaneously. This can drastically affect both the minimum cost and the final optimal grouping; more "balanced" groupings that keep all the processors busy are favored. There are even more sophisticated approaches.

== See also ==
- Associahedron
- Tamari lattice
