= Peripheral cycle =

Graph cycle which does not separate remaining elements

In this graph, the red triangle formed by vertices 1, 2, and 5 is a peripheral cycle: the four remaining edges form a single bridge. However, pentagon 1–2–3–4–5 is not peripheral, as the two remaining edges form two separate bridges.

In graph theory, a peripheral cycle (or peripheral circuit) in an undirected graph is, intuitively, a cycle that does not separate any part of the graph from any other part. Peripheral cycles (or, as they were initially called, peripheral polygons, because Tutte called cycles "polygons") were first studied by Tutte (1963), and play important roles in the characterization of planar graphs and in generating the cycle spaces of nonplanar graphs.

== Definitions ==
A peripheral cycle $C$ in a graph $G$ can be defined formally in one of several equivalent ways:

- $C$ is peripheral if it is a simple cycle in a connected graph with the property that, for every two edges $e_1$ and $e_2$ in $G\setminus C$, there exists a path in $G$ that starts with $e_1$, ends with $e_2$, and has no interior vertices belonging to $C$.
- If $C$ is any subgraph of $G$, a bridge of $C$ is a minimal subgraph $B$ of $G$ that is edge-disjoint from $C$ and that has the property that all of its points of attachment (vertices adjacent to edges in both $B$ and $G\setminus B$) belong to $C$. A simple cycle $C$ is peripheral if it has exactly one bridge.
- In a connected graph that is not a theta graph, peripheral cycles cannot have chords, because any chord would be a bridge, separated from the rest of the graph. In this case, $C$ is peripheral if it is an induced cycle with the property that the subgraph $G\setminus C$ formed by deleting the edges and vertices of $C$ is connected.

The equivalence of these definitions is not hard to see: a connected subgraph of $G\setminus C$ (together with the edges linking it to $C$), or a chord of a cycle that causes it to fail to be induced, must in either case be a bridge, and must also be an equivalence class of the binary relation on edges in which two edges are related if they are the ends of a path with no interior vertices in $C$.

== Properties ==
Peripheral cycles appear in the theory of polyhedral graphs, that is, 3-vertex-connected planar graphs. For every planar graph $G$, and every planar embedding of $G$, the faces of the embedding that are induced cycles must be peripheral cycles. In a polyhedral graph, all faces are peripheral cycles, and every peripheral cycle is a face. It follows from this fact that (up to combinatorial equivalence, the choice of the outer face, and the orientation of the plane) every polyhedral graph has a unique planar embedding.

In planar graphs, the cycle space is generated by the faces, but in non-planar graphs peripheral cycles play a similar role: for every 3-vertex-connected finite graph, the cycle space is generated by the peripheral cycles. The result can also be extended to locally finite but infinite graphs. In particular, it follows that 3-connected graphs are guaranteed to contain peripheral cycles. There exist 2-connected graphs that do not contain peripheral cycles (an example is the complete bipartite graph $K_{2,4}$, for which every cycle has two bridges) but if a 2-connected graph has minimum degree three then it contains at least one peripheral cycle.

Peripheral cycles in 3-connected graphs can be computed in linear time and have been used for designing planarity tests. They were also extended to the more general notion of non-separating ear decompositions. In some algorithms for testing planarity of graphs, it is useful to find a cycle that is not peripheral, in order to partition the problem into smaller subproblems. In a biconnected graph of circuit rank less than three (such as a cycle graph or theta graph) every cycle is peripheral, but every biconnected graph with circuit rank three or more has a non-peripheral cycle, which may be found in linear time.

Generalizing chordal graphs, Seymour & Weaver (1984) define a strangulated graph to be a graph in which every peripheral cycle is a triangle. They characterize these graphs as being the clique-sums of chordal graphs and maximal planar graphs.

== Related concepts ==
Peripheral cycles have also been called non-separating cycles, but this term is ambiguous, as it has also been used for two related but distinct concepts: simple cycles the removal of which would disconnect the remaining graph, and cycles of a topologically embedded graph such that cutting along the cycle would not disconnect the surface on which the graph is embedded.

In matroids, a non-separating circuit is a circuit of the matroid (that is, a minimal dependent set) such that deleting the circuit leaves a smaller matroid that is connected (that is, that cannot be written as a direct sum of matroids). These are analogous to peripheral cycles, but not the same even in graphic matroids (the matroids whose circuits are the simple cycles of a graph). For example, in the complete bipartite graph $K_{2,3}$, every cycle is peripheral (it has only one bridge, a two-edge path) but the graphic matroid formed by this bridge is not connected, so no circuit of the graphic matroid of $K_{2,3}$ is non-separating.
