= Cyclomatic number =

Fewest graph edges whose removal breaks all cycles

This graph has cyclomatic number r = 2 because it can be made into a tree by removing two edges, for instance the edges 1–2 and 2–3, but removing any one edge leaves a cycle in the graph.

In graph theory, a branch of mathematics, the cyclomatic number, circuit rank, cycle rank, corank or nullity of an undirected graph is the minimum number of edges that must be removed from the graph to break all its cycles, making it into a tree or forest.

The concept was introduced and called the cyclomatic number by Gustav Kirchhoff.

== Formula ==
The cyclomatic number of a graph equals the number of independent cycles in the graph, the size of a cycle basis. Unlike the corresponding feedback arc set problem for directed graphs, the cyclomatic number r is easily computed using the formula:
$$r = e - v + c,$$
where e is the number of edges in the given graph, v is the number of vertices, and c is the number of connected components.

It is possible to construct a minimum-size set of edges that breaks all cycles efficiently, either using a greedy algorithm or by complementing a spanning forest.

The cyclomatic number can be explained in terms of algebraic graph theory as the dimension of the cycle space of the graph, in terms of matroid theory as the dual rank of its graphic matroid, and in terms of topology as one of the Betti numbers of a topological space derived from the graph. It counts the ears in an ear decomposition of the graph, forms the basis of parameterized complexity on almost-trees, and has been applied in software metrics as part of the definition of cyclomatic complexity of a piece of code.

== For hypergraphs ==
The cyclomatic number of a hypergraph can be derived by its Levi graph, with the same cyclomatic number but reduced to a simple graph. It is
$$r = g - (v + e) + c,$$
where g is the degree sum (and the number of edges in the Levi graph), e is the number of hyperedges in the given hypergraph, v is the number of vertices, and c is the number of connected components.

The degree sum of a hypergraph is the sum of the degrees of all the vertices, reducing to 2e for a simple graph, or ke for a k-uniform hypergraph. This formula is symmetric between vertices and edges which demonstrates a hypergraph and its dual hypergraph have the same cyclomatic number.

== Matroid rank and construction of a minimum feedback edge set ==
The cyclomatic number of a graph G may be described using matroid theory as the dual rank of the graphic matroid of G. Using the greedy property of matroids, this means that one can find a minimum set of edges that breaks all cycles using a greedy algorithm that at each step chooses an edge that belongs to at least one cycle of the remaining graph.

Alternatively, a minimum set of edges that breaks all cycles can be found by constructing a maximal forest of G and choosing the complementary set of edges that do not belong to the maximal forest.

== The number of independent cycles ==
In algebraic graph theory, the cyclomatic number is also the dimension of the cycle space of $G$. Intuitively, this can be explained as meaning that the cyclomatic number counts the number of independent cycles in the graph, where a collection of cycles is independent if it is not possible to form one of the cycles as the symmetric difference of some subset of the others.

This count of independent cycles can also be explained using homology theory, a branch of topology. Any graph G may be viewed as an example of a 1-dimensional simplicial complex, a type of topological space formed by representing each graph edge by a line segment and gluing these line segments together at their endpoints. The cyclomatic number is the rank of the first (integer) homology group of this complex,
$$r = \operatorname{rank}\left[H_1(G,\Z)\right].$$
Because of this topological connection, the cyclomatic number of a graph G is also called the first Betti number of G. More generally, the first Betti number of any topological space, defined in the same way, counts the number of independent cycles in the space.

== Applications ==
=== Meshedness coefficient ===
A variant of the cyclomatic number for planar graphs, normalized by dividing by the maximum possible cyclomatic number of any planar graph with the same vertex set, is called the meshedness coefficient. For a connected planar graph with m edges and n vertices, the meshedness coefficient can be computed by the formula

$$\frac{m-n+1}{2n-5}.$$

Here, the numerator $m-n+1$ of the formula is the cyclomatic number of the given graph, and the denominator $2n-5$ is the largest possible cyclomatic number of an n-vertex planar graph. The meshedness coefficient ranges between 0 for trees and 1 for maximal planar graphs.

=== Ear decomposition ===
The cyclomatic number controls the number of ears in an ear decomposition of a graph, a partition of the edges of the graph into paths and cycles that is useful in many graph algorithms. In particular, a graph is 2-vertex-connected if and only if it has an open ear decomposition. This is a sequence of subgraphs, where the first subgraph is a simple cycle, the remaining subgraphs are all simple paths, each path starts and ends on vertices that belong to previous subgraphs, and each internal vertex of a path appears for the first time in that path. In any biconnected graph with circuit rank $r$, every open ear decomposition has exactly $r$ ears.

=== Almost-trees ===
A graph with cyclomatic number $r$ is also called an r-almost-tree, because only r edges need to be removed from the graph to make it into a tree or forest. A 1-almost-tree is a near-tree, and a connected near-tree is a pseudotree, a cycle with a (possibly trivial) tree rooted at each vertex.

Several authors have studied the parameterized complexity of graph algorithms on r-near-trees, parameterized by $r$.

=== Generalizations to directed graphs ===
The cycle rank is an invariant of directed graphs that measures the level of nesting of cycles in the graph. It has a more complicated definition than cyclomatic number (closely related to the definition of tree-depth for undirected graphs) and is more difficult to compute. Another problem for directed graphs related to the cyclomatic number is the minimum feedback arc set, the smallest set of edges whose removal breaks all directed cycles. Both cycle rank and the minimum feedback arc set are NP-hard to compute.

It is also possible to compute a simpler invariant of directed graphs by ignoring the directions of the edges and computing the circuit rank of the underlying undirected graph. This principle forms the basis of the definition of cyclomatic complexity, a software metric for estimating how complicated a piece of computer code is.

=== Computational chemistry ===
In the fields of chemistry and cheminformatics, the cyclomatic number of a molecular graph (the number of rings in the smallest set of smallest rings) is sometimes referred to as the Frèrejacque number.

=== Parametrized complexity ===
Some computational problems on graphs are NP-hard in general, but can be solved in polynomial time for graphs with a small cyclomatic number. An example is the path reconfiguration problem.

== Related concepts ==
Other numbers defined in terms of deleting things from graphs are:

- Edge connectivity - the minimum number of edges to delete in order to disconnect the graph;
- Matching preclusion - the minimum number of edges to delete in order to prevent the existence of a perfect matching;
- Feedback vertex set number - the minimum number of vertices to delete in order to make the graph acyclic;
- Feedback arc set - the minimum number of arcs to delete from a directed graph, in order to make it acyclic.
