= Stanhope Demonstrator =

Early logic machine

Now on display in the Science Museum, London

The Stanhope Demonstrator was the first machine to solve problems in logic. It was designed by Charles Stanhope, 3rd Earl Stanhope to demonstrate consequences in logic symbolically.

The first model was constructed in 1775. It consisted of two slides coloured red and gray mounted in a square brass frame. This could be used to demonstrate the solution to a syllogistic type of problem in which objects might have two different properties and the question was how many would have both properties. Scales marked zero to ten were used to set the numbers or proportions of objects with the two properties. This form of inference anticipated the numerically definite syllogism which Augustus De Morgan laid out in his book, Formal Logic, in 1847.

== Construction ==
The device was a brass plate about four inches square which was mounted on a piece of mahogany which was three-quarters of an inch thick. There was an opening with a depression in the wood about one and a half inches square and half an inch deep. This opening was called the holon, meaning "whole", and represented the full set of objects under consideration.

A slide of red translucent glass could be inserted from the right across the holon. A slide of gray wood could be slid under the red slide. When the device was used for the "Rule for the Logic of Certainty", the gray slider was inserted from the left. When it was used for the "Rule for the Logic of Probability", the gray slider was inserted from above. The red and the gray sliders represented the two affirmative propositions which were being combined. Stanhope called these ho and los.

At least four of the devices with this square style were built. In 1879, Robert Harley wrote that he had one which he had been given by Stanhope's great-grandson, Arthur, who had kept one. The other two were owned by Henry Prevost Babbage – the son of Charles Babbage, who continued his work on the Analytical Engine. One of the devices was donated to the Science Museum, London by the last Earl in 1953. Other styles, such as circular models, were constructed, but these were less convenient.

== See also ==
- Logical piano
- Venn diagram
