= Operations Research (journal) =

- Discipline: Operations research
- Language: English
- Edited by: Amy Ward

Publication details
- Former name(s): Journal of the Operations Research Society of America
- History: 1952–present
- Publisher: Institute for Operations Research and the Management Sciences
- Frequency: Bimonthly
- Impact factor: 2.604 (2018)

Standard abbreviations
- ISO 4: Oper. Res.

Indexing
- CODEN: OPREAI
- ISSN: 0030-364X (print); 1526-5463 (web)
- LCCN: 66099702
- JSTOR: 0030364X
- OCLC no.: 2394608
- Journal of the Operations Research Society of America
- ISSN: 0096-3984

Links
- Journal homepage; Online access; Online archive

Operations Research is a bimonthly peer-reviewed academic journal covering operations research that is published by the Institute for Operations Research and the Management Sciences. It was established in 1952 as the Journal of the Operations Research Society of America and obtained its current name in 1955. The editor-in-chief is Amy Ward (University of Chicago).

== Abstracting and indexing ==
The journal is abstracted and indexed by Mathematical Reviews, MathSciNet, Science Citation Index Expanded, Scopus, Social Sciences Citation Index, and Zentralblatt MATH. According to the Journal Citation Reports, the journal has a 2018 impact factor of 2.604.
