= Frank Ruskey =

Canadian mathematician and computer scientist

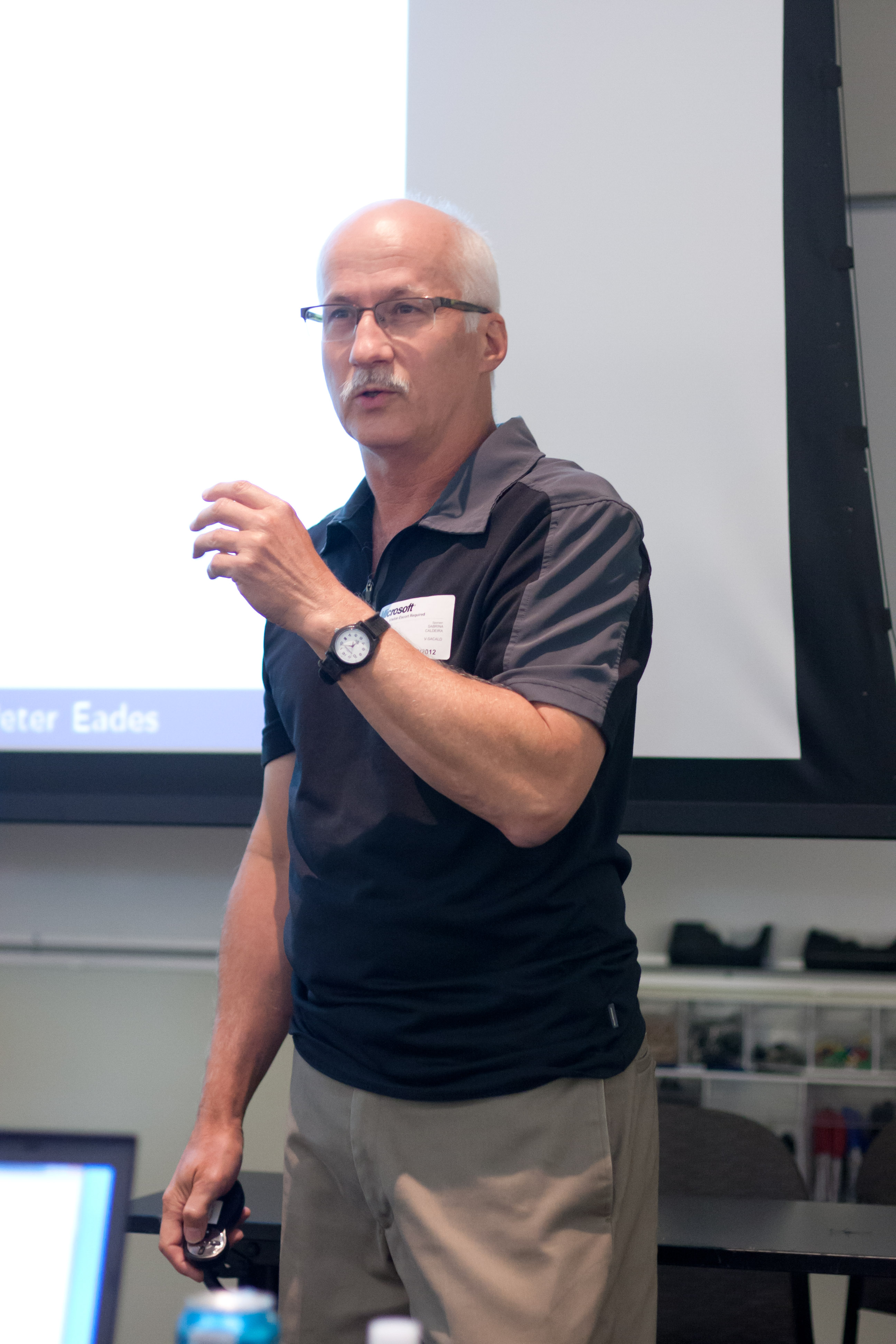
- Frank Ruskey at the Workshop on Theory and Practice of Graph Drawing, 2012
- Education: University of California, San Diego
- Scientific career
- Fields: Combinatorics, computer science
- Workplaces: University of Victoria
- Doctoral advisor: T. C. Hu

Frank Ruskey is a combinatorialist and computer scientist, and professor at the University of Victoria. His research involves algorithms for exhaustively listing discrete structures, combinatorial Gray codes, Venn and Euler diagrams, combinatorics on words, and enumerative combinatorics. Frank Ruskey is the author of the Combinatorial Object Server (COS), a website for information on and generation of combinatorial objects.

== Selected publications ==
- Lucas, J.M.; Vanbaronaigien, D.R.; Ruskey, F. (November 1993). "On Rotations and the Generation of Binary Trees". Journal of Algorithms. 15 (3): 343–366. doi:10.1006/jagm.1993.1045.
- Pruesse, Gara; Ruskey, Frank (April 1994). "Generating Linear Extensions Fast". SIAM Journal on Computing. 23 (2): 373–386. doi:10.1137/s0097539791202647.
- Ruskey, F.; Hu, T. C. (1977). "Generating Binary Trees Lexicographically". SIAM Journal on Computing. 6 (4): 745–758. doi:10.1137/0206055.
- Ruskey, Frank; Weston, Mark (June 2005). "A Survey of Venn Diagrams". The Electronic Journal of Combinatorics. doi:10.37236/26. Archived from the original on 11 October 2011.
