= SIAM Journal on Applied Mathematics =

- Discipline: Applied mathematics
- Language: English
- Edited by: Paul A. Martin

Publication details
- History: 1953-present
- Publisher: Society for Industrial and Applied Mathematics
- Impact factor: 1.698 (2017)

Standard abbreviations
- ISO 4: SIAM J. Appl. Math.

Indexing
- CODEN: SMJMAP
- ISSN: 0036-1399 (print); 1095-712X (web)
- JSTOR: 00361399
- OCLC no.: 1765537

Links
- Journal homepage; Online access

The SIAM Journal on Applied Mathematics is a peer-reviewed academic journal in applied mathematics published by the Society for Industrial and Applied Mathematics (SIAM), with Paul A. Martin (Colorado School of Mines) as its editor-in-chief. It was founded in 1953 as SIAM's first journal, the Journal of the Society for Industrial and Applied Mathematics, and was given its current name in 1966. In most years since 1999, it has been ranked by SCImago Journal Rank as a first-quartile journal in applied mathematics. Together with Communications on Pure and Applied Mathematics it has been called "one of the two greatest American entries in applied math".
