= Gomory–Hu tree =

Weighted tree representing s-t cuts of a graph

In combinatorial optimization, the Gomory–Hu tree of an undirected graph with capacities is a weighted tree that represents the minimum s-t cuts for all s-t pairs in the graph. The Gomory–Hu tree can be constructed in |V| − 1 maximum flow computations. It is named for Ralph E. Gomory and T. C. Hu.

== Definition ==
Let $G = (V_G, E_G, c)$ be an undirected graph with $c(u,v)$ being the capacity of the edge $(u,v)$ respectively.

Denote the minimum capacity of an s-t cut by $\lambda_{st}$ for each $s, t \in V_G$.
Let $T = (V_G, E_T)$ be a tree, and denote the set of edges in an s-t path by $P_{st}$ for each $s,t \in V_G$.

Then T is said to be a Gomory–Hu tree of G, if for each $s, t \in V_G$

$$\lambda_{st} = \min_{e\in P_{st}} c(S_e, T_e),$$

where

1. $S_e, T_e \subseteq V_G$ are the two connected components of $T \setminus \{e\}$, and thus $(S_e, T_e)$ forms an s-t cut in G.
2. $c(S_e, T_e)$ is the capacity of the $(S_e,T_e)$ cut in G.

== Algorithm ==
Gomory–Hu Algorithm

Input: A weighted undirected graph $G = ((V_G,E_G), c)$
Output: A Gomory–Hu Tree $T = (V_T, E_T).$

1. Set $V_T = \{V_G\}, \ E_T = \empty.$
2. Choose some $X \in V_T$ with |X| ≥ 2 if such X exists. Otherwise, go to step 6.
3. For each connected component $C = (V_C,E_C) \in T \setminus X,$ let $S_C = \bigcup_{v_T \in V_C} v_T.$
  Let $S = \{ S_C \mid C \text{ is a connected component in } T \setminus X \}.$
  Contract the components to form $G' = ((V_{G'}, E_{G'}), c'),$ where:
  $$\begin{align}
V_{G'} &= X \cup S \\[2pt]
E_{G'} &= E_G|_{X \times X} \cup \{(u, S_C) \in X \times S \mid (u,v) \in E_G \text{ for some } v \in S_C \} \\[2pt]
& \qquad \qquad \quad\! \cup \{(S_{C1}, S_{C2}) \in S \times S \mid (u,v) \in E_G \text{ for some } u \in S_{C1} \text{ and } v \in S_{C2} \}
\end{align}$$
  $c':V_{G'} \times V_{G'} \to R^+$ is the capacity function, defined as:
  $$\begin{align}
&\text{if }\ (u,S_C) \in E_G|_{X \times S}: &&c'(u,S_C) = \!\!\! \sum_{\begin{smallmatrix} v \in S_C : \\ (u,v) \in E_G \end{smallmatrix}} \!\!\! c(u,v) \\[4pt]
&\text{if }\ (S_{C1},S_{C2}) \in E_G|_{S \times S}: &&c'(S_{C1},S_{C2}) = \!\!\!\!\!\!\! \sum_{\begin{smallmatrix} (u,v) \in E_G : \\ u \in S_{C1} \, \land \, v \in S_{C2} \end{smallmatrix}} \!\!\!\!\! c(u,v) \\[4pt]
&\text{otherwise}: &&c'(u,v) = c(u,v)
\end{align}$$
4. Choose two vertices s, t ∈ X and find a minimum s-t cut (A′, B′) in G'.
  Set $A = \Biggl(\bigcup_{S_C \in A' \cap S} \!\!\! S_C \! \Biggr) \cup (A' \cap X),\$$B = \Biggl(\bigcup_{S_C \in B' \cap S} \!\!\! S_C \! \Biggr) \cup (B' \cap X).$
5. Set $V_T = (V_T \setminus X) \cup \{A \cap X, B \cap X \}.$
  For each $e = (X, Y) \in E_T$ do:
  1. Set $e' = (A \cap X,Y)$ if $Y \subset A,$ otherwise set $e' = (B \cap X,Y).$
  2. Set $E_T = (E_T \setminus \{e\}) \cup \{e'\}.$
  3. Set $w(e') = w(e).$
  Set $E_T = E_T \cup \{(A \cap X,\ B \cap X) \}.$
  Set $w((A \cap X, B \cap X)) = c'(A', B').$
  Go to step 2.
6. Replace each $\{v\} \in V_T$ by v and each $(\{u\},\{v\}) \in E_T$ by (u, v). Output T.

== Analysis ==
Using the submodular property of the capacity function c, one has
$$c(X) + c(Y) \ge c(X \cap Y) + c(X \cup Y).$$
Then it can be shown that the minimum s-t cut in G' is also a minimum s-t cut in G for any s, t ∈ X.

To show that for all $(P,Q) \in E_T,$ $w(P,Q) = \lambda_{pq}$ for some p ∈ P, q ∈ Q throughout the algorithm, one makes use of the following lemma,

For any i, j, k in V_{G}, $\lambda_{ik} \ge \min(\lambda_{ij}, \lambda_{jk}).$

The lemma can be used again repeatedly to show that the output T satisfies the properties of a Gomory–Hu Tree.

== Example ==
The following is a simulation of the Gomory–Hu algorithm, where

1. green circles are vertices of T.
2. red and blue circles are the vertices in G'.
3. grey vertices are the chosen s and t.
4. red and blue coloring represents the s-t cut.
5. dashed edges are the s-t cut-set.
6. A is the set of vertices circled in red and B is the set of vertices circled in blue.

	G'	T
	1. Set V_{T} = {V_{G}} = { {0, 1, 2, 3, 4, 5} } and E_{T} = ∅.; 2. Since V_{T} has only one vertex, choose X = V_{G} = {0, 1, 2, 3, 4, 5}. Note that | X | = 6 ≥ 2.	
1.		
	3. Since T\X = ∅, there is no contraction and therefore G' = G.; 4. Choose s = 1 and t = 5. The minimum s-t cut (A', B') is ({0, 1, 2, 4}, {3, 5}) with c'(A', B') = 6.; Set A = {0, 1, 2, 4} and B = {3, 5}.: 5. Set V_{T} = (V_{T}\X) ∪ {A ∩ X, B ∩ X} = { {0, 1, 2, 4}, {3, 5} }.; Set E_{T} = { ({0, 1, 2, 4}, {3, 5}) }. Set w( ({0, 1, 2, 4}, {3, 5}) ) = c'(A', B') = 6. Go to step 2.: 2. Choose X = {3, 5}. Note that | X | = 2 ≥ 2.	
2.		
	3. {0, 1, 2, 4} is the connected component in T\X and thus S = { {0, 1, 2, 4} }.; Contract {0, 1, 2, 4} to form G', where c'( (3, {0, 1, 2 ,4}) ) = c( (3, 1) ) + c( (3, 4) ) = 4. c'( (5, {0, 1, 2, 4}) ) = c( (5, 4) ) = 2. c'( (3, 5)) = c( (3, 5) ) = 6.: 4. Choose s = 3, t = 5. The minimum s-t cut (A', B') in G' is ( {{0, 1, 2, 4}, 3}, {5} ) with c'(A', B') = 8.; Set A = {0, 1, 2, 3, 4} and B = {5}.: 5. Set V_{T} = (V_{T}\X) ∪ {A ∩ X, B ∩ X} = { {0, 1, 2, 4}, {3}, {5} }.; Since (X, {0, 1, 2, 4}) ∈ E_{T} and {0, 1, 2, 4} ⊂ A, replace it with (A ∩ X, Y) = ({3}, {0, 1, 2 ,4}). Set E_{T} = { ({3}, {0, 1, 2 ,4}), ({3}, {5}) } with w(({3}, {0, 1, 2 ,4})) = w((X, {0, 1, 2, 4})) = 6. w(({3}, {5})) = c'(A', B') = 8. Go to step 2.: 2. Choose X = {0, 1, 2, 4}. Note that | X | = 4 ≥ 2.	
3.		
	3. { {3}, {5} } is the connected component in T\X and thus S = { {3, 5} }.; Contract {3, 5} to form G', where c'( (1, {3, 5}) ) = c( (1, 3) ) = 3. c'( (4, {3, 5}) ) = c( (4, 3) ) + c( (4, 5) ) = 3. c'(u,v) = c(u,v) for all u,v ∈ X.: 4. Choose s = 1, t = 2. The minimum s-t cut (A', B') in G' is ( {1, {3, 5}, 4}, {0, 2} ) with c'(A', B') = 6.; Set A = {1, 3, 4, 5} and B = {0, 2}.: 5. Set V_{T} = (V_{T}\X) ∪ {A ∩ X, B ∩ X} = { {3}, {5}, {1, 4}, {0, 2} }.; Since (X, {3}) ∈ E_{T} and {3} ⊂ A, replace it with (A ∩ X, Y) = ({1, 4}, {3}). Set E_{T} = { ({1, 4}, {3}), ({3}, {5}), ({0, 2}, {1, 4}) } with w(({1, 4}, {3})) = w((X, {3})) = 6. w(({0, 2}, {1, 4})) = c'(A', B') = 6. Go to step 2.: 2. Choose X = {1, 4}. Note that | X | = 2 ≥ 2.	
4.		
	3. { {3}, {5} }, { {0, 2} } are the connected components in T\X and thus S = { {0, 2}, {3, 5} }; Contract {0, 2} and {3, 5} to form G', where c'( (1, {3, 5}) ) = c( (1, 3) ) = 3. c'( (4, {3, 5}) ) = c( (4, 3) ) + c( (4, 5) ) = 3. c'( (1, {0, 2}) ) = c( (1, 0) ) + c( (1, 2) ) = 2. c'( (4, {0, 2}) ) = c( (4, 2) ) = 4. c'(u,v) = c(u,v) for all u,v ∈ X.: 4. Choose s = 1, t = 4. The minimum s-t cut (A', B') in G' is ( {1, {3, 5}}, {{0, 2}, 4} ) with c'(A', B') = 7.; Set A = {1, 3, 5} and B = {0, 2, 4}.: 5. Set V_{T} = (V_{T}\X) ∪ {A ∩ X, B ∩ X} = { {3}, {5}, {0, 2}, {1}, {4} }.; Since (X, {3}) ∈ E_{T} and {3} ⊂ A, replace it with (A ∩ X, Y) = ({1}, {3}). Since (X, {0, 2}) ∈ E_{T} and {0, 2} ⊂ B, replace it with (B ∩ X, Y) = ({4}, {0, 2}). Set E_{T} = { ({1}, {3}), ({3}, {5}), ({4}, {0, 2}), ({1}, {4}) } with w(({1}, {3})) = w((X, {3})) = 6. w(({4}, {0, 2})) = w((X, {0, 2})) = 6. w(({1}, {4})) = c'(A', B') = 7. Go to step 2.: 2. Choose X = {0, 2}. Note that | X | = 2 ≥ 2.	
5.		
	3. { {1}, {3}, {4}, {5} } is the connected component in T\X and thus S = { {1, 3, 4, 5} }.; Contract {1, 3, 4, 5} to form G', where c'( (0, {1, 3, 4, 5}) ) = c( (0, 1) ) = 1. c'( (2, {1, 3, 4, 5}) ) = c( (2, 1) ) + c( (2, 4) ) = 5. c'( (0, 2) ) = c( (0, 2) ) = 7.: 4. Choose s = 0, t = 2. The minimum s-t cut (A', B') in G' is ( {0}, {2, {1, 3, 4, 5}} ) with c'(A', B') = 8.; Set A = {0} and B = {1, 2, 3 ,4 ,5}.: 5. Set V_{T} = (V_{T}\X) ∪ {A ∩ X, B ∩ X} = { {3}, {5}, {1}, {4}, {0}, {2} }.; Since (X, {4}) ∈ E_{T} and {4} ⊂ B, replace it with (B ∩ X, Y) = ({2}, {4}). Set E_{T} = { ({1}, {3}), ({3}, {5}), ({2}, {4}), ({1}, {4}), ({0}, {2}) } with w(({2}, {4})) = w((X, {4})) = 6. w(({0}, {2})) = c'(A', B') = 8. Go to step 2.: 2. There does not exist X∈V_{T} with | X | ≥ 2. Hence, go to step 6.	
6.		
	6. Replace V_{T} = { {3}, {5}, {1}, {4}, {0}, {2} } by {3, 5, 1, 4, 0, 2}.; Replace E_{T} = { ({1}, {3}), ({3}, {5}), ({2}, {4}), ({1}, {4}), ({0}, {2}) } by { (1, 3), (3, 5), (2, 4), (1, 4), (0, 2) }. Output T. Note that exactly | V | − 1 = 6 − 1 = 5 times min-cut computation is performed.	

== Implementations: Sequential and Parallel ==
Gusfield's algorithm can be used to find a Gomory–Hu tree without any vertex contraction in the same running time-complexity, which simplifies the implementation of constructing a Gomory–Hu Tree.

Andrew V. Goldberg and K. Tsioutsiouliklis implemented the Gomory-Hu algorithm and Gusfield algorithm, and performed an experimental evaluation and comparison.

Cohen et al. report results on two parallel implementations of Gusfield's algorithm using OpenMP and MPI, respectively.

== Related concepts ==
In planar graphs, the Gomory–Hu tree is dual to the minimum weight cycle basis, in the sense that the cuts of the Gomory–Hu tree are dual to a collection of cycles in the dual graph that form a minimum-weight cycle basis.

== See also ==
- Cut (graph theory)
- Max-flow min-cut theorem
- Maximum flow problem
