= Carl Hierholzer =

German mathematician

Carl Hierholzer (2 October 1840 – 13 September 1871) was a German mathematician.

== Biography ==
Hierholzer studied mathematics in Polytechnic School in Karlsruhe, and he got his Ph.D. from Ruprecht-Karls-Universität Heidelberg in 1865. His Ph.D. advisor was Ludwig Otto Hesse (1811–1874). In 1870 Hierholzer wrote his habilitation about conic sections (title: Ueber Kegelschnitte im Raum) in Karlsruhe, where he later became a Privatdozent.

Hierholzer proved that a connected graph has an Eulerian trail if and only if exactly zero or two of its vertices have an odd degree. This result had been given, with no proof of the 'if' part, by Leonhard Euler in 1736. Hierholzer apparently presented his work to a circle of fellow mathematicians not long before his premature death in 1871. A colleague then arranged for its posthumous publication in a paper that appeared in 1873.
