= Subcoloring =

A non-optimal subcoloring with four colors. Merging the red and blue colors, and the green and yellow colors, produces a subcoloring with only two colors.

In graph theory, a subcoloring is an assignment of colors to a graph's vertices such that each color class induces a vertex disjoint union of cliques. That is, each color class should form a cluster graph.

The subchromatic number $\chi_S(G)$ of a graph $G$ is the fewest colors needed in any subcoloring of $G$.

Subcoloring and subchromatic number were introduced by Michael O. Albertson, Robert E. Jamison, Stephen T. Hedetniemi, and Stephen C. Locke in 1989.

Every proper coloring and cocoloring of a graph are also subcolorings, so the subchromatic number of any graph is at most equal to the cochromatic number, which is at most equal to the chromatic number.

Subcoloring is as difficult to solve exactly as coloring, in the sense that (like coloring) it is NP-complete. More specifically, the problem of determining whether a planar graph has subchromatic number at most 2 is NP-complete, even if it is a

- triangle-free graph with maximum degree 4,
- comparability graph with maximum degree 4,
- line graph of a bipartite graph with maximum degree 4,
- or a graph with girth 5.

The subchromatic number of a cograph can be computed in polynomial time. For every fixed integer $r$, it is possible to decide in polynomial time whether the subchromatic number of interval and permutation graphs is at most $r$.
