= Clique graph (disambiguation) =

The term "clique graph" may refer to:

- Complete graph, a graph in which every two vertices are adjacent
- Clique (graph theory), a complete subgraph
- Clique graph, the intersection graph of maximal cliques
- Simplex graph, a graph with a vertex for each clique in the original graph, with an edge between vertices that represent cliques that differ by exactly one vertex

== See also ==
- Cluster graph, a graph in which each component is a clique
