= Strong perfect graph theorem =

Perfect graphs have neither odd holes nor odd antiholes

In graph theory, the strong perfect graph theorem is a forbidden graph characterization of the perfect graphs as being exactly the graphs that have neither odd holes (odd-length induced cycles of length at least 5) nor odd antiholes (complements of odd holes). It was conjectured by Claude Berge in 1961. A proof by Maria Chudnovsky, Neil Robertson, Paul Seymour, and Robin Thomas was announced in 2002 and published by them in 2006.

The proof of the strong perfect graph theorem won for its authors a $10,000 prize offered by Gérard Cornuéjols of Carnegie Mellon University and the 2009 Fulkerson Prize.

== Statement ==
A perfect graph is a graph in which, for every induced subgraph, the size of the maximum clique equals the minimum number of colors in a coloring of the graph; perfect graphs include many well-known graph classes including the bipartite graphs, chordal graphs, and comparability graphs. In his 1961 and 1963 works defining for the first time this class of graphs, Claude Berge observed that it is impossible for a perfect graph to contain an odd hole, an induced subgraph in the form of an odd-length cycle graph of length five or more, because odd holes have clique number two and chromatic number three. Similarly, he observed that perfect graphs cannot contain odd antiholes, induced subgraphs complementary to odd holes: an odd antihole with 2k + 1 vertices has clique number k and chromatic number k + 1, which is again impossible for perfect graphs. The graphs having neither odd holes nor odd antiholes became known as the Berge graphs.

Berge conjectured that every Berge graph is perfect, or equivalently that the perfect graphs and the Berge graphs define the same class of graphs. This became known as the strong perfect graph conjecture, until its proof in 2002, when it was renamed the strong perfect graph theorem.

== Relation to the weak perfect graph theorem ==
Another conjecture of Berge, proved in 1972 by László Lovász, is that the complement of every perfect graph is also perfect. This became known as the perfect graph theorem, or (to distinguish it from the strong perfect graph conjecture/theorem) the weak perfect graph theorem. Because Berge's forbidden graph characterization is self-complementary, the weak perfect graph theorem follows immediately from the strong perfect graph theorem.

== Proof ideas ==
The proof of the strong perfect graph theorem by Chudnovsky et al. follows an outline conjectured in 2001 by Conforti, Cornuéjols, Robertson, Seymour, and Thomas, according to which every Berge graph either forms one of five types of basic building block (special classes of perfect graphs) or it has one of four different types of structural decomposition into simpler graphs. A minimally imperfect Berge graph cannot have any of these decompositions, from which it follows that no counterexample to the theorem can exist. This idea was based on previous conjectured structural decompositions of similar type that would have implied the strong perfect graph conjecture but turned out to be false.

The five basic classes of perfect graphs that form the base case of this structural decomposition are the bipartite graphs, line graphs of bipartite graphs, complementary graphs of bipartite graphs, complements of line graphs of bipartite graphs, and double split graphs. It is easy to see that bipartite graphs are perfect: in any nontrivial induced subgraph, the clique number and chromatic number are both two and therefore are equal. The perfection of complements of bipartite graphs, and of complements of line graphs of bipartite graphs, are both equivalent to Kőnig's theorem relating the sizes of maximum matchings, maximum independent sets, and minimum vertex covers in bipartite graphs. The perfection of line graphs of bipartite graphs can be stated equivalently as the fact that bipartite graphs have chromatic index equal to their maximum degree, proven by Kőnig (1916). Thus, all four of these basic classes are perfect. The double split graphs are a relative of the split graphs that can also be shown to be perfect.

The four types of decompositions considered in this proof are 2-joins, complements of 2-joins, balanced skew partitions, and homogeneous pairs.

A 2-join is a partition of the vertices of a graph into two subsets, with the property that the edges spanning the cut between these two subsets form two vertex-disjoint complete bipartite graphs. When a graph has a 2-join, it may be decomposed into induced subgraphs called "blocks", by replacing one of the two subsets of vertices by a shortest path within that subset that connects one of the two complete bipartite graphs to the other; when no such path exists, the block is formed instead by replacing one of the two subsets of vertices by two vertices, one for each complete bipartite subgraph. A 2-join is perfect if and only if its two blocks are both perfect. Therefore, if a minimally imperfect graph has a 2-join, it must equal one of its blocks, from which it follows that it must be an odd cycle and not Berge. For the same reason, a minimally imperfect graph whose complement has a 2-join cannot be Berge.

A skew partition is a partition of a graph's vertices into two subsets, one of which induces a disconnected subgraph and the other of which has a disconnected complement; Chvátal (1985) had conjectured that no minimal counterexample to the strong perfect graph conjecture could have a skew partition. Chudnovsky et al. introduced some technical constraints on skew partitions, and were able to show that Chvátal's conjecture is true for the resulting "balanced skew partitions". The full conjecture is a corollary of the strong perfect graph theorem.

A homogeneous pair is related to a modular decomposition of a graph. It is a partition of the graph into three subsets V_{1}, V_{2}, and V_{3} such that V_{1} and V_{2} together contain at least three vertices, V_{3} contains at least two vertices, and for each vertex v in V_{3} and each i in {1,2} either v is adjacent to all vertices in V_{i} or to none of them. It is not possible for a minimally imperfect graph to have a homogeneous pair. Subsequent to the proof of the strong perfect graph conjecture, Chudnovsky (2006) simplified it by showing that homogeneous pairs could be eliminated from the set of decompositions used in the proof.

The proof that every Berge graph falls into one of the five basic classes or has one of the four types of decomposition follows a case analysis, according to whether certain configurations exist within the graph: a "stretcher", a subgraph that can be decomposed into three induced paths subject to certain additional constraints, the complement of a stretcher, and a "proper wheel", a configuration related to a wheel graph, consisting of an induced cycle together with a hub vertex adjacent to at least three cycle vertices and obeying several additional constraints. For each possible choice of whether a stretcher or its complement or a proper wheel exists within the given Berge graph, the graph can be shown to be in one of the basic classes or to be decomposable. This case analysis completes the proof.
