= Simplicial vertex =

Vertex 3 (circled red) is bisimplicial, as the set of it and its neighbors is the union of 2 cliques (denoted in black).

In graph theory, a simplicial vertex $v$ is a vertex whose closed neighborhood $N_{G}[v]$ in a graph $G$ forms a clique, where every pair of neighbors is adjacent to each other.

A vertex of a graph is bisimplicial if the set of it and its neighbours is the union of two cliques, and is k-simplicial if the set is the union of k cliques. A vertex is co-simplicial if its non-neighbours form an independent set.

Addario-Berry et al. demonstrated that every even-hole-free graph (or more specifically, even-cycle-free graph, as 4-cycles are also excluded here) contains a bisimplicial vertex, which settled a conjecture by Reed. The proof was later shown to be flawed by Chudnovsky & Seymour, who gave a correct proof. Due to this property, the family of all even-cycle-free graphs is $\chi$-bounded.

== See also ==
- Even-hole-free graph
- $\chi$-bounded family of graphs
