= Strangulated graph =

Graph whose peripheral cycles are all triangles

A strangulated graph, formed by using clique-sums to glue together a maximal planar graph (yellow) and two chordal graphs (red and blue). The red chordal graph can in turn be decomposed into clique-sums of four maximal planar graphs (two edges and two triangles).

In graph theoretic mathematics, a strangulated graph is a graph in which deleting the edges of any induced cycle of length greater than three would disconnect the remaining graph. That is, they are the graphs in which every peripheral cycle is a triangle.

== Examples ==
In a maximal planar graph, or more generally in every polyhedral graph, the peripheral cycles are exactly the faces of a planar embedding of the graph, so a polyhedral graph is strangulated if and only if all the faces are triangles, or equivalently it is maximal planar. Every chordal graph is strangulated, because the only induced cycles in chordal graphs are triangles, so there are no longer cycles to delete.

== Characterization ==
A clique-sum of two graphs is formed by identifying together two equal-sized cliques in each graph, and then possibly deleting some of the clique edges. For the version of clique-sums relevant to strangulated graphs, the edge deletion step is omitted. A clique-sum of this type between two strangulated graphs results in another strangulated graph, for every long induced cycle in the sum must be confined to one side or the other (otherwise it would have a chord between the vertices at which it crossed from one side of the sum to the other), and the disconnected parts of that side formed by deleting the cycle must remain disconnected in the clique-sum. Every chordal graph can be decomposed in this way into a clique-sum of complete graphs, and every maximal planar graph can be decomposed into a clique-sum of 4-vertex-connected maximal planar graphs.

As Seymour & Weaver (1984) show, these are the only possible building blocks of strangulated graphs: the strangulated graphs are exactly the graphs that can be formed as clique-sums of complete graphs and maximal planar graphs.

== See also ==
- Line perfect graph, a graph in which every odd cycle is a triangle
