= Line perfect graph =

Graph whose line graph is perfect

A line perfect graph. The edges in each biconnected component are colored black if the component is bipartite, blue if the component is a tetrahedron, and red if the component is a book of triangles.

In graph theory, a line perfect graph is a graph whose line graph is a perfect graph. Equivalently, these are the graphs in which every odd-length simple cycle is a triangle.

A graph is line perfect if and only if each of its biconnected components is a bipartite graph, the complete graph K_{4}, or a triangular book K_{1,1,n}. Because these three types of biconnected component are all perfect graphs themselves, every line perfect graph is itself perfect. By similar reasoning, every line perfect graph is a parity graph, a Meyniel graph, and a perfectly orderable graph.

Line perfect graphs generalize the bipartite graphs, and share with them the properties that the maximum matching and minimum vertex cover have the same size, and that the chromatic index equals the maximum degree.

== See also ==
- Strangulated graph, a graph in which every peripheral cycle is a triangle
