= Distance-hereditary graph =

Graph whose induced subgraphs preserve distance

A distance-hereditary graph.

In graph theory, a branch of discrete mathematics, a distance-hereditary graph (also called a completely separable graph) is a graph in which the distances in any connected induced subgraph are the same as they are in the original graph. Thus, any induced subgraph inherits the distances of the larger graph.

Distance-hereditary graphs were named and first studied by Howorka (1977), although an equivalent class of graphs was already shown to be perfect in 1970 by Olariu and Sachs.

It has been known for some time that the distance-hereditary graphs constitute an intersection class of graphs, but no intersection model was known until one was given by Gioan & Paul (2012).

== Definition and characterization ==
The original definition of a distance-hereditary graph is a graph G such that, if any two vertices u and v belong to a connected induced subgraph H of G, then some shortest path connecting u and v in G must be a subgraph of H, so that the distance between u and v in H is the same as the distance in G.

Distance-hereditary graphs can also be characterized in several other equivalent ways:

- They are the graphs in which every induced path is a shortest path, or equivalently the graphs in which every non-shortest path has at least one edge connecting two non-consecutive path vertices.
- They are the graphs in which every cycle of length five or more has at least two crossing diagonals.
- They are the graphs in which, for every four vertices u, v, w, and x, at least two of the three sums of distances d(u, v) + d(w, x), d(u, w) + d(v, x), and d(u, x) + d(v, w) are equal to each other.
- They are the graphs that do not have as isometric subgraphs any cycle of length five or more, or any of three other graphs: a 5-cycle with one chord, a 5-cycle with two non-crossing chords, and a 6-cycle with a chord connecting opposite vertices.

Three operations by which any distance-hereditary graph can be constructed.

- They are the graphs that can be built up from a single vertex by a sequence of the following three operations, as shown in the illustration:
  1. Add a new pendant vertex connected by a single edge to an existing vertex of the graph.
  2. Replace any vertex of the graph by a pair of vertices, each of which has the same set of neighbors as the replaced vertex. The new pair of vertices are called false twins of each other.
  3. Replace any vertex of the graph by a pair of vertices, each of which has as its neighbors the neighbors of the replaced vertex together with the other vertex of the pair. The new pair of vertices are called true twins of each other.
- They are the graphs that can be completely decomposed into cliques and stars (complete bipartite graphs K_{1,q}) by a split decomposition. In this decomposition, one finds a partition of the graph into two subsets, such that the edges separating the two subsets form a complete bipartite subgraph, forms two smaller graphs by replacing each of the two sides of the partition by a single vertex, and recursively partitions these two subgraphs.
- They are exactly the graphs of rank-width at most one, where the rank-width of a graph is defined as the minimum, over all hierarchical partitions of the vertices of the graph, of the maximum rank among certain submatrices of the graph's adjacency matrix determined by the partition.
- They are the HHDG-free graphs, meaning that they have a forbidden graph characterization according to which no induced subgraph can be a house (the complement graph of a five-vertex path graph), hole (a cycle graph of five or more vertices), domino (six-vertex cycle plus a diagonal edge between two opposite vertices), or gem (five-vertex cycle plus two diagonals incident to the same vertex).

== Relation to other graph families ==
Every distance-hereditary graph is a perfect graph, more specifically a perfectly orderable graph and a Meyniel graph. Every distance-hereditary graph is also a parity graph, a graph in which every two induced paths between the same pair of vertices both have odd length or both have even length. Every even power of a distance-hereditary graph G (that is, the graph G^{2i} formed by connecting pairs of vertices at distance at most 2i in G) is a chordal graph.

Every distance-hereditary graph can be represented as the intersection graph of chords on a circle, forming a circle graph. This can be seen by building up the graph by adding pendant vertices, false twins, and true twins, at each step building up a corresponding set of chords representing the graph. Adding a pendant vertex corresponds to adding a chord near the endpoints of an existing chord so that it crosses only that chord; adding false twins corresponds to replacing a chord by two parallel chords crossing the same set of other chords; and adding true twins corresponds to replacing a chord by two chords that cross each other but are nearly parallel and cross the same set of other chords.

A distance-hereditary graph is bipartite if and only if it is triangle-free. Bipartite distance-hereditary graphs can be built up from a single vertex by adding only pendant vertices and false twins, since any true twin would form a triangle, but the pendant vertex and false twin operations preserve bipartiteness. Every bipartite distance-hereditary graph is chordal bipartite and modular.

The graphs that can be built from a single vertex by pendant vertices and true twins, without any false twin operations, are special cases of the Ptolemaic graphs and include the block graphs. The graphs that can be built from a single vertex by false twin and true twin operations, without any pendant vertices, are the cographs, which are therefore distance-hereditary; the cographs are exactly the disjoint unions of diameter-2 distance-hereditary graphs. The neighborhood of any vertex in a distance-hereditary graph is a cograph. The transitive closure of the directed graph formed by choosing any set of orientations for the edges of any tree is distance-hereditary; the special case in which the tree is oriented consistently away from some vertex forms a subclass of distance-hereditary graphs known as the trivially perfect graphs, which are also called chordal cographs.

== Algorithms ==
Distance-hereditary graphs can be recognized, and parsed into a sequence of pendant vertex and twin operations, in linear time.

Because distance-hereditary graphs are perfect, some optimization problems can be solved in polynomial time for them despite being NP-hard for more general classes of graphs. Thus, it is possible in polynomial time to find the maximum clique or maximum independent set in a distance-hereditary graph, or to find an optimal graph coloring of any distance-hereditary graph. Because distance-hereditary graphs are circle graphs, they inherit polynomial time algorithms for circle graphs; for instance, it is possible determine in polynomial time the treewidth of any circle graph and therefore of any distance-hereditary graph. Additionally, the clique-width of any distance-hereditary graph is at most three. As a consequence, by Courcelle's theorem, efficient dynamic programming algorithms exist for many problems on these graphs.

Several other optimization problems can also be solved more efficiently using algorithms specifically designed for distance-hereditary graphs. As D'Atri & Moscarini (1988) show, a minimum connected dominating set (or equivalently a spanning tree with the maximum possible number of leaves) can be found in polynomial time on a distance-hereditary graph. A Hamiltonian cycle or Hamiltonian path of any distance-hereditary graph can also be found in polynomial time.
