= Graphs with few cliques =

In graph theory, a class of graphs is said to have few cliques if every member of the class has a polynomial number of maximal cliques. Certain generally NP-hard computational problems are solvable in polynomial time on such classes of graphs, making graphs with few cliques of interest in computational graph theory, network analysis, and other branches of applied mathematics. Informally, a family of graphs has few cliques if the graphs do not have a large number of large clusters.

== Definition ==
A clique of a graph is a complete subgraph, while a maximal clique is a clique that is not properly contained in another clique. One can regard a clique as a cluster of vertices, since they are by definition all connected to each other by an edge. The concept of clusters is ubiquitous in data analysis, such as on the analysis of social networks. For that reason, limiting the number of possible maximal cliques has computational ramifications for algorithms on graphs or networks.

Formally, let $X$ be a class of graphs. If for every $n$-vertex graph $G$ in $X$, there exists a polynomial $f(n)$ such that $G$ has $O(f(n))$ maximal cliques, then $X$ is said to be a class of graphs with few cliques.

== Examples ==
- The Turán graph $T(n, \lceil n/3 \rceil)$ has an exponential number of maximal cliques. In particular, this graph has exactly $3^{n/3}$maximal cliques when $n \equiv 0 \mod 3$, which is asymptotically greater than any polynomial function. This graph is sometimes called the Moon-Moser graph, after Moon & Moser showed in 1965 that this graph has the largest number of maximal cliques among all graphs on $n$ vertices. So the class of Turán graphs does not have few cliques.
- A tree $T$ on $n$ vertices has as many maximal cliques as edges, since it contains no triangles by definition. Any tree has exactly $n-1$ edges, and therefore that number of maximal cliques. So the class of trees has few cliques.
- A chordal graph on $n$ vertices has at most $n$ maximal cliques, so chordal graphs have few cliques.
- Any planar graph on $n$ vertices has at most $8n-16$ maximal cliques, so the class of planar graphs has few cliques.
- Any $n$-vertex graph with boxicity $b$ has $O(n^b)$ maximal cliques, so the class of graphs with bounded boxicity has few cliques.
- Any $n$-vertex graph with degeneracy $d$ has at most $(n-d)3^{d/3}$ maximal cliques whenever $d \equiv 0 \mod 3$ and $n \geq d+3$, so the class of graphs with bounded degeneracy has few cliques.
- Let $G$ be an intersection graph of $n$ convex polytopes in $d$-dimensional Euclidean space whose facets are parallel to $k$ hyperplanes. Then the number of maximal cliques of $G$ is $O\left(n^{dk^{d+1}} \right)$, which is polynomial in $n$ for fixed $d$ and $k$. Therefore, the class of intersection graphs of convex polytopes in fixed-dimensional Euclidean space with a bounded number of facets has few cliques.
