= Even-hole-free graph =

Graph containing no induced cycles with an even number of nodes

An induced cycle of length 4 is possible in the first graph, making it an even-hole-free graph, but not an even-cycle-free graph. The second has no even cycles and so fits both categories.

In the mathematical area of graph theory, a graph is even-hole-free if it contains no induced cycle with an even number of vertices. More precisely, the definition may allow the graph to have induced cycles of length four, or may also disallow them: the latter is referred to as even-cycle-free graphs.

Addario-Berry et al. (2008) demonstrated that every even-cycle-free graph contains a bisimplicial vertex (a vertex whose neighborhood is the union of two cliques), which settled a conjecture by Reed. The proof was later shown to be flawed by Chudnovsky & Seymour (2023), who gave a correct proof.

== Recognition ==
Conforti et al. (2002b) gave the first polynomial time recognition algorithm for even-hole-free graphs, which runs in ${\mathcal O}(n^{40})$ time. da Silva & Vušković (2008) later improved this to ${\mathcal O}(n^{19})$. Chang & Lu (2012) and Chang & Lu (2015) improved this to ${\mathcal O}(n^{11})$ time. The best currently known algorithm is given by Lai, Lu & Thorup (2020) which runs in ${\mathcal O}(n^9)$ time.

While even-hole-free graphs can be recognized in polynomial time, it is NP-complete to determine whether a graph contains an even hole that includes a specific vertex.

It is unknown whether graph coloring and the maximum independent set problem can be solved in polynomial time on even-hole-free graphs, or whether they are NP-complete. However the maximum clique can be found in even-hole-free graphs in polynomial time.
