= Cluster graph =

Graph made from disjoint union of complete graphs

A cluster graph with clusters (complete subgraphs) of sizes 1, 2, 3, 4, 4, 5, and 6

In graph theory, a branch of mathematics, a cluster graph is a graph formed from the disjoint union of complete graphs. Equivalently, a graph is a cluster graph if and only if it has no three-vertex induced path; for this reason, the cluster graphs are also called P_{3}-free graphs. They are the complement graphs of the complete multipartite graphs and the 2-leaf powers. The cluster graphs are transitively closed, and every transitively closed undirected graph is a cluster graph.

The cluster graphs are the graphs for which the relation "being equal or adjacent" is an equivalence relation, and their connected components are the equivalence classes for this relation.

== Related graph classes ==
Every cluster graph is a block graph, a cograph, and a claw-free graph. Every maximal independent set in a cluster graph chooses a single vertex from each cluster, so the size of such a set always equals the number of clusters; because all maximal independent sets have the same size, cluster graphs are well-covered. The Turán graphs are complement graphs of cluster graphs, with all complete subgraphs of equal or nearly-equal size. The locally clustered graph (graphs in which every neighborhood is a cluster graph) are the diamond-free graphs, another family of graphs that contains the cluster graphs.

When a cluster graph is formed from cliques that are all the same size, the overall graph is a homogeneous graph, meaning that every isomorphism between two of its induced subgraphs can be extended to an automorphism of the whole graph. With only two exceptions, the cluster graphs and their complements are the only finite homogeneous graphs, and infinite cluster graphs also form one of only a small number of different types of countably infinite homogeneous graphs.

== Computational problems ==
A subcoloring of a graph is a partition of its vertices into induced cluster graphs. Thus, the cluster graphs are exactly the graphs of subchromatic number 1.

The computational problem of finding a small set of edges to add or remove from a graph to transform it into a cluster graph is called cluster editing. It is NP-complete but fixed-parameter tractable.

Given a complete graph with edge costs (positive and negative) the clique partitioning problem asks for a subgraph that is a cluster graph such that the sum of the costs of the edges of the cluster graph is minimal. This problem is closely related to the correlation clustering problem.
