= Cograph =

Graph formed by complementation and disjoint union

The Turán graph T(13,4) is a cograph

In graph theory, a cograph, or complement-reducible graph, or P_{4}-free graph, is a graph that can be generated from the single-vertex graph K_{1} by complementation and disjoint union. That is, the family of cographs is the smallest class of graphs that includes K_{1} and is closed under complementation and disjoint union.

Cographs have been discovered independently by several authors since the 1970s; early references include Jung (1978), Lerchs (1971), Seinsche (1974), and Sumner (1974). They have also been called D*-graphs, hereditary Dacey graphs (after the related work of James C. Dacey Jr. on orthomodular lattices), and 2-parity graphs. They have a simple structural decomposition involving disjoint union and complement graph operations that can be represented concisely by a labeled tree and used algorithmically to efficiently solve many problems such as finding a maximum clique that are hard on more general graph classes.

Special types of cograph include complete graphs, complete bipartite graphs, cluster graphs, and threshold graphs. Cographs are, in turn, special cases of the distance-hereditary graphs, permutation graphs, comparability graphs, and perfect graphs.

== Definition ==
=== Recursive construction ===
Any cograph may be constructed using the following rules:

1. any single-vertex graph is a cograph;
2. if $G$ is a cograph, so is its complement, $\overline{G}$;
3. if $G$ and $H$ are cographs, so is their disjoint union, $G\cup H$.

The cographs may be defined as the graphs that can be constructed using these operations, starting from the single-vertex graphs. Alternatively, instead of using the complement operation, one can use the join operation, which consists of forming the disjoint union $G\cup H$ and then adding an edge between every pair of a vertex from $G$ and a vertex from $H$.

=== Other characterizations ===
Several alternative characterizations of cographs can be given. Among them:

- A cograph is a graph which does not contain the path P_{4} on 4 vertices (and hence of length 3) as an induced subgraph. That is, a graph is a cograph if and only if for any four vertices $v_1,v_2,v_3,v_4$, if $\{v_1,v_2\},\{v_2,v_3\}$ and $\{v_3,v_4\}$ are edges of the graph then at least one of $\{v_1,v_3\},\{v_1,v_4\}$ or $\{v_2,v_4\}$ is also an edge.
- A cograph is a graph all of whose induced subgraphs have the property that any maximal clique intersects any maximal independent set in a single vertex.
- A cograph is a graph in which every nontrivial induced subgraph has at least two vertices with the same neighbourhoods.
- A cograph is a graph in which every nontrivial connected induced subgraph has a disconnected complement.
- A cograph is a graph all of whose connected induced subgraphs have diameter at most 2.
- A cograph is a graph in which every connected component is a distance-hereditary graph with diameter at most 2.
- A cograph is a graph with clique-width at most 2.
- A cograph is a comparability graph of a series-parallel partial order.
- A cograph is a permutation graph of a separable permutation.
- A cograph is a graph all of whose minimal chordal completions are trivially perfect graphs.
- A cograph is a hereditarily well-colored graph, a graph such that every greedy coloring of every induced subgraph uses an optimal number of colors.
- A graph is a cograph if and only if every vertex order of the graph is a perfect order, since having no P_{4} means that no obstruction to a perfect order will exist in any vertex order.

== Cotrees ==
A cotree and the corresponding cograph. Each edge (u,v) in the cograph has a matching color to the least common ancestor of u and v in the cotree.

A cotree is a tree in which the internal nodes are labeled with the numbers 0 and 1. Every cotree T defines a cograph G having the leaves of T as vertices, and in which the subtree rooted at each node of T corresponds to the induced subgraph in G defined by the set of leaves descending from that node:

- A subtree consisting of a single leaf node corresponds to an induced subgraph with a single vertex.
- A subtree rooted at a node labeled 0 corresponds to the union of the subgraphs defined by the children of that node.
- A subtree rooted at a node labeled 1 corresponds to the join of the subgraphs defined by the children of that node; that is, we form the union and add an edge between every two vertices corresponding to leaves in different subtrees. Alternatively, the join of a set of graphs can be viewed as formed by complementing each graph, forming the union of the complements, and then complementing the resulting union.

An equivalent way of describing the cograph formed from a cotree is that two vertices are connected by an edge if and only if the lowest common ancestor of the corresponding leaves is labeled by 1. Conversely, every cograph can be represented in this way by a cotree. If we require the labels on any root-leaf path of this tree to alternate between 0 and 1, this representation is unique.

== Computational properties ==
Cographs may be recognized in linear time, and a cotree representation constructed, using modular decomposition, partition refinement, LexBFS , or split decomposition. Once a cotree representation has been constructed, many familiar graph problems may be solved via simple bottom-up calculations on the cotrees.

For instance, to find the maximum clique in a cograph, compute in bottom-up order the maximum clique in each subgraph represented by a subtree of the cotree. For a node labeled 0, the maximum clique is the maximum among the cliques computed for that node's children. For a node labeled 1, the maximum clique is the union of the cliques computed for that node's children, and has size equal to the sum of the children's clique sizes. Thus, by alternately maximizing and summing values stored at each node of the cotree, we may compute the maximum clique size, and by alternately maximizing and taking unions, we may construct the maximum clique itself. Similar bottom-up tree computations allow the maximum independent set, vertex coloring number, maximum clique cover, and Hamiltonicity (that is the existence of a Hamiltonian cycle) to be computed in linear time from a cotree representation of a cograph. Because cographs have bounded clique-width, Courcelle's theorem may be used to test any property in the monadic second-order logic of graphs (MSO_{1}) on cographs in linear time.

The problem of testing whether a given graph is k vertices away and/or t edges away from a cograph is fixed-parameter tractable. Deciding if a graph can be k-edge-deleted to a cograph can be solved in O^{*}(2.562^{k}) time, and k-edge-edited to a cograph in O^{*}(4.612^{k}). If the largest induced cograph subgraph of a graph can be found by deleting k vertices from the graph, it can be found in O^{*}(3.115^{k}) time.

Two cographs are isomorphic if and only if their cotrees (in the canonical form with no two adjacent vertices with the same label) are isomorphic. Because of this equivalence, one can determine in linear time whether two cographs are isomorphic, by constructing their cotrees and applying a linear time isomorphism test for labeled trees.

If H is an induced subgraph of a cograph G, then H is itself a cograph; the cotree for H may be formed by removing some of the leaves from the cotree for G and then suppressing nodes that have only one child. It follows from Kruskal's tree theorem that the relation of being an induced subgraph is a well-quasi-ordering on the cographs. Thus, if a subfamily of the cographs (such as the planar cographs) is closed under induced subgraph operations then it has a finite number of forbidden induced subgraphs. Computationally, this means that testing membership in such a subfamily may be performed in linear time, by using a bottom-up computation on the cotree of a given graph to test whether it contains any of these forbidden subgraphs. However, when the sizes of two cographs are both variable, testing whether one of them is an induced subgraph of the other is NP-complete.

Cographs play a key role in algorithms for recognizing read-once functions.

Some counting problems also become tractable when the input is restricted to be a cograph. For instance, there are polynomial-time algorithms to count the number of cliques or the number of maximum cliques in a cograph.

== Enumeration ==
The number of connected cographs with n vertices, for n = 1, 2, 3, ..., is:

1, 1, 2, 5, 12, 33, 90, 261, 766, 2312, 7068, 21965, 68954, ... (sequence A000669 in the OEIS)

For n > 1 there are the same number of disconnected cographs, because for every cograph exactly one of it or its complement graph is connected.

== Related graph families ==
=== Subclasses ===
Every complete graph K_{n} is a cograph, with a cotree consisting of a single 1-node and n leaves. Similarly, every complete bipartite graph K_{a,b} is a cograph. Its cotree is rooted at a 1-node which has two 0-node children, one with a leaf children and one with b leaf children. A Turán graph may be formed by the join of a family of equal-sized independent sets; thus, it also is a cograph, with a cotree rooted at a 1-node that has a child 0-node for each independent set.

Every threshold graph is also a cograph. A threshold graph may be formed by repeatedly adding one vertex, either connected to all previous vertices or to none of them; each such operation is one of the disjoint union or join operations by which a cotree may be formed.

=== Superclasses ===
The characterization of cographs by the property that every clique and maximal independent set have a nonempty intersection is a stronger version of the defining property of strongly perfect graphs, in which there every induced subgraph contains an independent set that intersects all maximal cliques. In a cograph, every maximal independent set intersects all maximal cliques. Thus, every cograph is strongly perfect.

The fact that cographs are P_{4}-free implies that they are perfectly orderable. In fact, every vertex order of a cograph is a perfect order which further implies that max clique finding and min colouring can be found in linear time with any greedy colouring and without the need for a cotree decomposition.

Every cograph is a distance-hereditary graph, meaning that every induced path in a cograph is a shortest path. The cographs may be characterized among the distance-hereditary graphs as having diameter at most two in each connected component. Every cograph is also a comparability graph of a series-parallel partial order, obtained by replacing the disjoint union and join operations by which the cograph was constructed by disjoint union and ordinal sum operations on partial orders. Because strongly perfect graphs, perfectly orderable graphs, distance-hereditary graphs, and comparability graphs are all perfect graphs, cographs are also perfect.
