= Clique graph =

Graph representing structure of another graph's cliques

A graph G and its clique graph K(G).

In graph theory, a clique graph of an undirected graph G is another graph K(G) that represents the structure of cliques in G.

Clique graphs were discussed at least as early as 1968, and a characterization of clique graphs was given in 1971.

== Formal definition ==
A clique of a graph G is a set X of vertices of G with the property that every pair of distinct vertices in X are adjacent in G. A maximal clique of a graph G is a clique X of vertices of G, such that there is no clique Y of vertices of G that contains all of X and at least one other vertex.

Given a graph G, its clique graph K(G) is a graph such that

- every vertex of K(G) represents a maximal clique of G; and
- two vertices of K(G) are adjacent when the underlying cliques in G share at least one vertex in common.

That is, the clique graph K(G) is the intersection graph of the maximal cliques of G.

== Characterization ==
A graph H is the clique graph K(G) of another graph if and only if there exists a collection C of cliques in H whose union covers all the edges of H, such that C forms a Helly family. This means that, if S is a subset of C with the property that every two members of S have a non-empty intersection, then S itself should also have a non-empty intersection. However, the cliques in C do not necessarily have to be maximal cliques.

When H =K(G), a family C of this type may be constructed in which each clique in C corresponds to a vertex v in G, and consists of the cliques in G that contain v. These cliques all have v in their intersection, so they form a clique in H. The family C constructed in this way has the Helly property, because any subfamily of C with pairwise nonempty intersections must correspond to a clique in G, which can be extended to a maximal clique that belongs to the intersection of the subfamily.

Conversely, when H has a Helly family C of its cliques, covering all edges of H, then it is the clique graph K(G) for a graph G whose vertices are the disjoint union of the vertices of H and the elements of C. This graph G has an edge for each pair of cliques in C with nonempty intersection, and for each pair of a vertex of H and a clique in C that contains it. However, it does not contain any edges connecting pairs of vertices in H. The maximal cliques in this graph G each consist of one vertex of H together with all the cliques in C that contain it, and their intersection graph is isomorphic to H.

However, this characterization does not lead to efficient algorithms: the problem of recognizing whether a given graph is a clique graph is NP-complete.
