= Induced subgraph =

Graph made from a subset of another graph's nodes and their edges

In graph theory, an induced subgraph of a graph is another graph, formed from a subset of the vertices of the graph and all of the edges from the original graph which connect pairs of vertices in that subset.

== Definition ==
Formally, let $G=(V,E)$ be any graph, and let $S\subseteq V$ be any subset of vertices of G. Then the induced subgraph $G[S]$ is the graph whose vertex set is $S$ and whose edge set consists of all of the edges in $E$ that have both endpoints in $S$. That is, for any two vertices $u,v\in S$, $u$ and $v$ are adjacent in $G[S]$ if and only if they are adjacent in $G$. The same definition works for undirected graphs, directed graphs, and even multigraphs.

The induced subgraph $G[S]$ may also be called the subgraph induced in $G$ by $S$, or (if context makes the choice of $G$ unambiguous) the induced subgraph of $S$.

== Examples ==
Important types of induced subgraphs include the following.

The snake-in-the-box problem concerns the longest induced paths in hypercube graphs

- Induced paths are induced subgraphs that are paths. The shortest path between any two vertices in an unweighted graph is always an induced path, because any additional edges between pairs of vertices that could cause it to be not induced would also cause it to be not shortest. Conversely, in distance-hereditary graphs, every induced path is a shortest path.
- Induced cycles are induced subgraphs that are cycles. The girth of a graph is defined by the length of its shortest cycle, which is always an induced cycle. According to the strong perfect graph theorem, induced cycles and their complements play a critical role in the characterization of perfect graphs.
- Cliques and independent sets are induced subgraphs that are respectively complete graphs or edgeless graphs.
- Induced matchings are induced subgraphs that are matchings.
- The neighborhood of a vertex is the induced subgraph of all vertices adjacent to it.

== Computation ==
The induced subgraph isomorphism problem is a form of the subgraph isomorphism problem in which the goal is to test whether one graph can be found as an induced subgraph of another. Because it includes the clique problem as a special case, it is NP-complete.
