= List of unsolved problems in mathematics =

Many mathematical problems have been stated but not yet solved. These problems come from many areas of mathematics, such as theoretical physics, computer science, algebra, analysis, combinatorics, algebraic, differential, discrete and Euclidean geometries, graph theory, group theory, mathematical logic, number theory, set theory, Ramsey theory, dynamical systems, and partial differential equations. Some problems belong to more than one discipline and are studied using techniques from different areas. Prizes are often awarded for the solution to a long-standing problem, and some lists of unsolved problems, such as the Millennium Prize Problems, receive considerable attention.

This list is a composite of notable unsolved problems mentioned in previously published lists, including but not limited to lists considered authoritative, and the problems listed here vary widely in both difficulty and importance.

== Notable lists ==
For over a century, various mathematicians and organizations have published and promoted lists of unsolved mathematical problems. In some cases, the lists have been associated with prizes for the discoverers of solutions, with the Millennium Prize Problems each containing a reward of one million dollars.

List	Number of problems	Number unsolved or incompletely solved	Proposed by	Proposed in
Hilbert's problems	23	13	David Hilbert	1900
Landau's problems	4	4	Edmund Landau	1912
Taniyama's problems	36	–	Yutaka Taniyama	1955
Thurston's 24 questions	24	2	William Thurston	1982
Smale's problems	18	14	Stephen Smale	1998
Millennium Prize Problems	7	6	Clay Mathematics Institute	2000
Simon problems	15	12	Barry Simon	2000
DARPA's math challenges	23	–	DARPA	2007
Erdős's problems	≥ 1221	635	Paul Erdős	Over six decades of Erdős' career, from the 1930s to 1990s

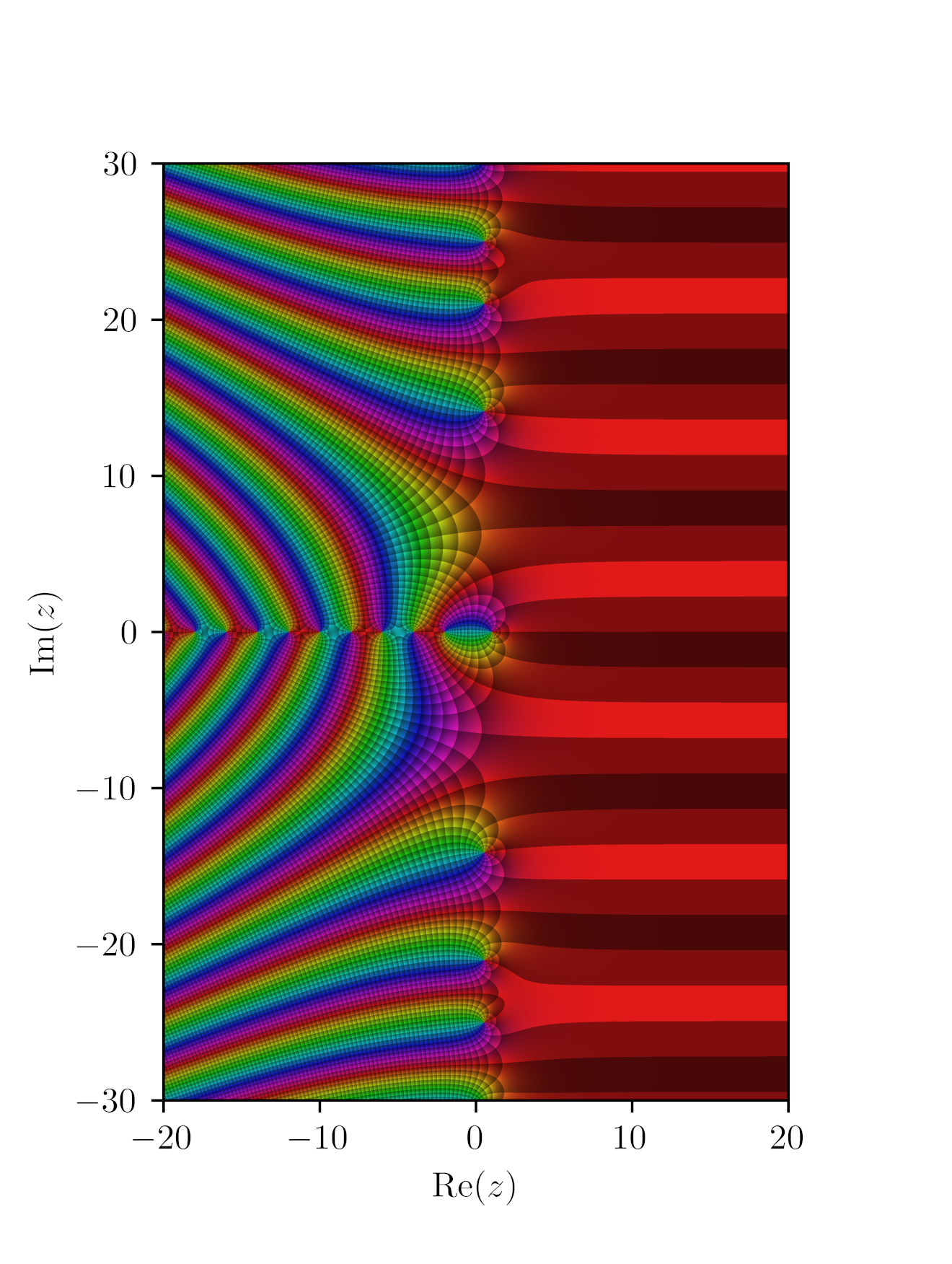
The Riemann zeta function, subject of the Riemann hypothesis

=== Millennium Prize Problems ===
Of the original seven Millennium Prize Problems listed by the Clay Mathematics Institute in 2000, six remain unsolved as of October 2026:

- Birch and Swinnerton-Dyer conjecture
- Hodge conjecture
- Navier–Stokes existence and smoothness (Note: OpenAI have claimed a solution to the problem, although it was seen with some controversy as of November 2026. See Navier–Stokes priority controversy.)
- P versus NP
- Riemann hypothesis
- Yang–Mills existence and mass gap

The seventh problem, the Poincaré conjecture, was solved by Grigori Perelman in 2003.

Contrary to most of the Hilbert problems and many other problems described in this article which allow for varying interpretations, the Millennium Prize problems are precisely described to provide clear conditions to award winners. After Perelman's resolution of the Poincaré conjecture, the official descriptions of the remaining six problems were codified by six specialists and released publicly. While the problems can touch upon greater research topics, and can themselves be only special cases of more general open problems, the Clay Institute decided upon these particular cases of the problems:

- The Poincaré conjecture can be formulated in terms of the generalized Poincaré conjecture for different categories of manifolds. In the category of piecewise linear manifolds, the generalized conjecture is still an open problem for 4-dimensional manifolds. For differential manifolds, it is known to be false generally, but it is an open problem to determine in which dimensions it is true. In other words, it is not yet fully known on which spheres there exist no exotic smooth structures. The Millennium Prize was offered for the topological version of the conjecture, that remained open only for 3-dimensional manifolds during the publication of the list.
- The Birch and Swinnerton-Dyer conjecture can be formulated for elliptic curves over any number field, and generalizations for more general arithmetic objects have been proposed. The Millennium Prize is offered for resolving the conjecture for elliptic curves over rational numbers.
- The Navier–Stokes equations have a general form that can take into account many physical phenomena including the difference between volume viscosity and dynamic viscosity, compressible flow, change of viscosities in the flow, and an external force. The Millennium Prize is offered for proving any one of four statements, two of which deal with the Navier–Stokes equations with no external force while the other two deal with the Navier–Stokes equations with a smooth external force.
- The Riemann hypothesis has many generalizations for different types of L-functions that are expected to be true. The Millennium Prize problem is offered for showing the original Riemann hypothesis for the Riemann zeta function.

=== Notebooks ===
- The Kourovka Notebook (Russian: Коуровская тетрадь) is a collection of unsolved problems in group theory, first published in 1965 and updated many times since.
- The Sverdlovsk Notebook (Russian: Свердловская тетрадь) is a collection of unsolved problems in semigroup theory, first published in 1965 and updated every 2 to 4 years since.
- The Dniester Notebook (Russian: Днестровская тетрадь) lists several hundred unsolved problems in algebra, particularly ring theory and modulus theory.
- The Erlagol Notebook (Russian: Эрлагольская тетрадь) lists unsolved problems in algebra and model theory.

== Unsolved problems ==
=== Algebra ===
In the Bloch sphere representation of a qubit, a SIC-POVM forms a regular tetrahedron. Zauner conjectured that analogous structures exist in complex Hilbert spaces of all finite dimensions.

- Birch–Tate conjecture on the relation between the order of the center of the Steinberg group of the ring of integers of a number field to the field's Dedekind zeta function.
- Casas-Alvero conjecture: if a polynomial of degree $d$ defined over a field $K$ of characteristic $0$ has a factor in common with its first through $d - 1$-th derivative, then must $f$ be the $d$-th power of a linear polynomial?
- Determinantal conjecture on the determinant of the sum of two normal matrices.
- Eilenberg–Ganea conjecture: a group with cohomological dimension 2 also has a 2-dimensional Eilenberg–MacLane space $K(G, 1)$.
- Farrell–Jones conjecture on whether certain assembly maps are isomorphisms.
  - Bost conjecture: a specific case of the Farrell–Jones conjecture
- Finite lattice representation problem: is every finite lattice isomorphic to the congruence lattice of some finite algebra?
- Goncharov conjecture on the cohomology of certain motivic complexes.
- Green's conjecture: the Clifford index of a non-hyperelliptic curve is determined by the extent to which it, as a canonical curve, has linear syzygies.
- Grothendieck–Katz p-curvature conjecture: a conjectured local–global principle for linear ordinary differential equations.
- Hadamard conjecture: for every positive integer $k$, a Hadamard matrix of order $4k$ exists. (Note: Constructions are now known for every order below 2000 divisible by 4. In August 2026, Levent Alpöge, Philippe Voinov and Saul Reynolds-Haertle announced matrices for the twelve remaining unknown orders below 2000, the smallest of which, 668, had been open since 2005.)
  - Williamson conjecture: the problem of finding Williamson matrices, which can be used to construct Hadamard matrices.
  - Lander's conjecture: if an abelian group of order $v$ contains a difference set of order $n$, and a prime $p$ divides both $v$ and $n$, must the Sylow $p$-subgroup be non-cyclic? This implies Ryser's cyclic difference-set conjecture, and hence the circulant Hadamard conjecture.
  - Ryser's conjecture on circulant Hadamard matrices: no real circulant Hadamard matrix has order greater than 4.
    - Barker sequence conjecture: no Barker sequence has length greater than 13; equivalently, none has even length greater than 4.
- Hadamard's maximal determinant problem: what is the largest determinant of a matrix with entries all equal to 1 or −1?
- Hilbert's fifteenth problem: put Schubert calculus on a rigorous foundation.
- Hilbert's sixteenth problem: what are the possible configurations of the connected components of M-curves?
- Homological conjectures in commutative algebra
- Jacobson's conjecture: the intersection of all powers of the Jacobson radical of a left-and-right Noetherian ring is precisely 0.
- Kaplansky's conjectures
- Köthe conjecture: if a ring has no nil ideal other than $\{0\}$, then it has no nil one-sided ideal other than $\{0\}$.
- Monomial conjecture on Noetherian local rings
- Existence of perfect cuboids and associated cuboid conjectures
- Pierce–Birkhoff conjecture: every piecewise-polynomial $f:\mathbb{R}^{n}\rightarrow\mathbb{R}$ is the maximum of a finite set of minimums of finite collections of polynomials.
- Rota's basis conjecture: for matroids of rank $n$ with $n$ disjoint bases $B_{i}$, it is possible to create an $n \times n$ matrix whose rows are $B_{i}$ and whose columns are also bases.
- Serre's conjecture II: if $G$ is a simply connected semisimple algebraic group over a perfect field of cohomological dimension at most $2$, then the Galois cohomology set $H^{1}(F, G)$ is zero.
- Serre's positivity conjecture that if $R$ is a commutative regular local ring, and $P, Q$ are prime ideals of $R$, then $\dim (R/P) + \dim (R/Q) = \dim (R)$ implies $\chi(R/P, R/Q) > 0$.
- Uniform boundedness conjecture for rational points: do algebraic curves of genus $g \geq 2$ over number fields $K$ have at most some bounded number $N(K, g)$ of $K$-rational points?
- Wild problems: problems involving classification of pairs of $n\times n$ matrices under simultaneous conjugation.
- Zariski–Lipman conjecture: for a complex algebraic variety $V$ with coordinate ring $R$, if the derivations of $R$ are a free module over $R$, then $V$ is smooth.
- Zauner's conjecture: do SIC-POVMs exist in all dimensions?

==== Group theory ====
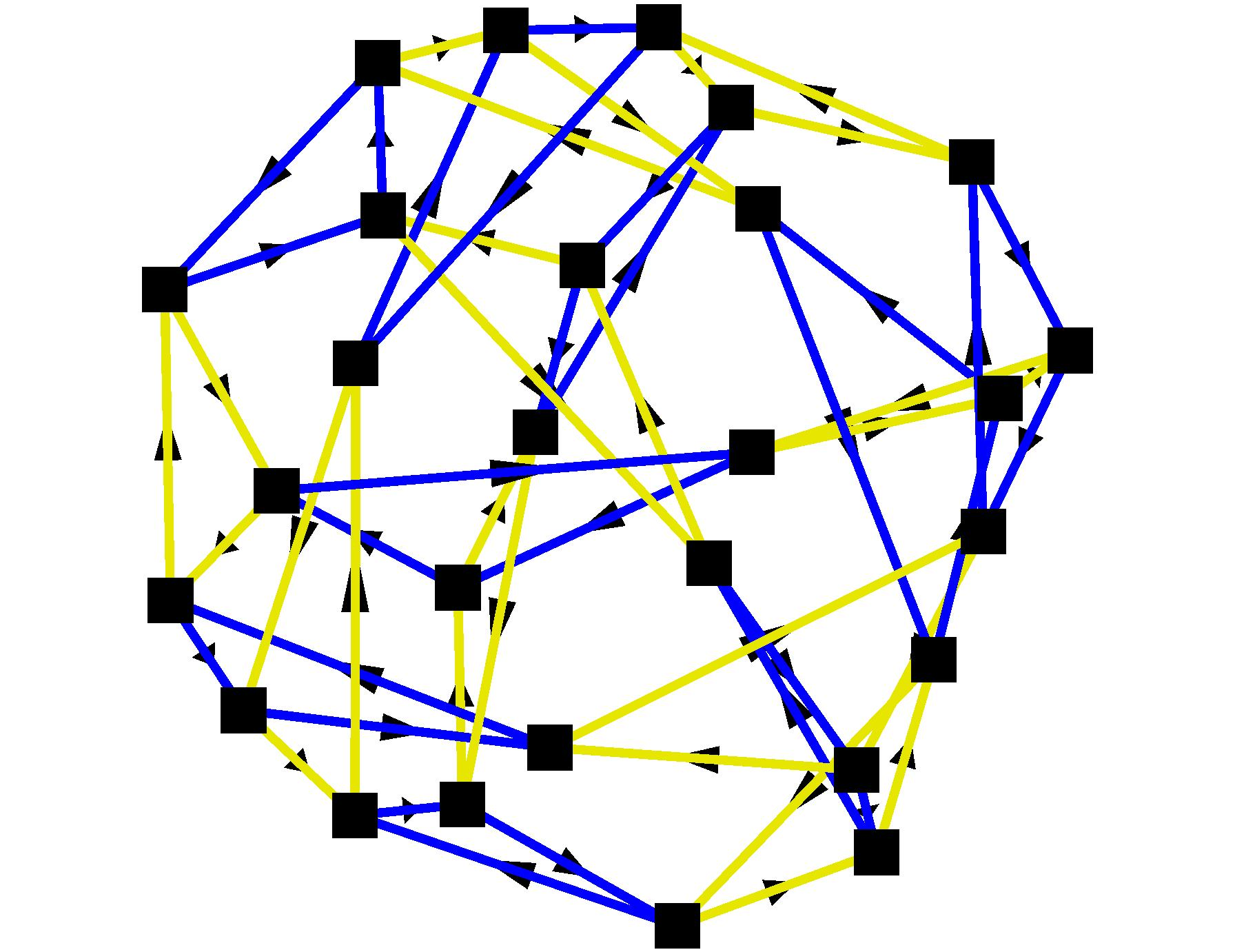
The free Burnside group $B(2,3)$ is finite; in its Cayley graph, shown here, each of its 27 elements is represented by a vertex. The question of which other groups $B(m,n)$ are finite remains open.

- Andrews–Curtis conjecture: every balanced presentation of the trivial group can be transformed into a trivial presentation by a sequence of Nielsen transformations on relators and conjugations of relators
- Bounded Burnside problem: for which positive integers m, n is the free Burnside group B(m,n) finite? In particular, is B(2, 5) finite?
- Guralnick–Thompson conjecture on the composition factors of groups in genus-0 systems
- Herzog–Schönheim conjecture: if a finite system of left cosets of subgroups of a group $G$ form a partition of $G$, then the finite indices of said subgroups cannot be distinct.
- The inverse Galois problem: is every finite group the Galois group of a Galois extension of the rationals?
- Isomorphism problem of Coxeter groups
- Are there an infinite number of Leinster groups?
- Does generalized moonshine exist?
- Is every finitely presented periodic group finite?
- Is every group surjunctive?
- Problems in loop theory and quasigroup theory consider generalizations of groups

==== Representation theory ====
- Arthur's conjectures
- Dade's conjecture relating the numbers of characters of blocks of a finite group to the numbers of characters of blocks of local subgroups.
- Demazure conjecture on representations of algebraic groups over the integers.
- McKay conjecture: in a group $G$, the number of irreducible complex characters of degree not divisible by a prime number $p$ is equal to the number of irreducible complex characters of the normalizer of any Sylow $p$-subgroup within $G$.

=== Analysis ===
- The Brennan conjecture: estimating the integral powers of the moduli of the derivative of conformal maps into the open unit disk, on certain subsets of $\mathbb{C}$
- Fuglede's conjecture on whether nonconvex sets in $\mathbb{R}$ and $\mathbb{R}^{2}$ are spectral if and only if they tile by translation.
- Goodman's conjecture on the coefficients of multivalued functions
- Invariant subspace problem – does every bounded operator on a complex Banach space send some non-trivial closed subspace to itself?
- Kung–Traub conjecture on the optimal order of a multipoint iteration without memory
- Lehmer's conjecture on the Mahler measure of non-cyclotomic polynomials
- The mean value problem: given a complex polynomial $f$ of degree $d \ge 2$ and a complex number $z$, is there a critical point $c$ of $f$ such that $|f(z)-f(c)| \le |f'(z)||z-c|$?
- The Pompeiu problem on the topology of domains for which some nonzero function has integrals that vanish over every congruent copy
- Vitushkin's conjecture on compact subsets of $\mathbb{C}$ with analytic capacity $0$
- What is the exact value of Landau's constants, including Bloch's constant?
- Regularity of solutions of Euler equations
- Convergence of the Flint Hills series
- Regularity of solutions of Vlasov–Maxwell equations
- Are there infinitely many Lehmer pairs?

=== Combinatorics ===
- The 1/3–2/3 conjecture – does every finite partially ordered set that is not totally ordered contain two elements x and y such that the probability that x appears before y in a random linear extension is between 1/3 and 2/3?
- The Dittert conjecture concerning the maximum achieved by a particular function of matrices with real, nonnegative entries satisfying a summation condition
- Problems in Latin squares – open questions concerning Latin squares
- The lonely runner conjecture – if $k$ runners with pairwise distinct speeds run round a track of unit length, will every runner be "lonely" (that is, be at least a distance $1/k$ from each other runner) at some time?
- Superpermutations - smallest possible string of n digits that contains all possible permutations of n
- Map folding – various problems in map folding and stamp folding.
- No-three-in-line problem – how many points can be placed in the $n \times n$ grid so that no three of them lie on a line?
- Rudin's conjecture on the number of squares in finite arithmetic progressions
- The sunflower conjecture – can the number of $k$ size sets required for the existence of a sunflower of $r$ sets be bounded by an exponential function in $k$ for every fixed $r>2$?
- Frankl's union-closed sets conjecture – for any family of sets closed under sums there exists an element (of the underlying space) belonging to half or more of the sets
- Give a combinatorial interpretation of the Kronecker coefficients
- The size $m(n)$ of the smallest collection of $n$-uniform sets without Property B for $n \ge 5$
- The values of the Dedekind numbers $M(n)$ for $n \ge 10$
- The values of the Ramsey numbers (particularly $R(5, 5)$) as well as asymptotic growth (e.g. of $R(n,n)$)
- The values of the Van der Waerden numbers
- Finding a function to model n-step self-avoiding walks

=== Dynamical systems ===
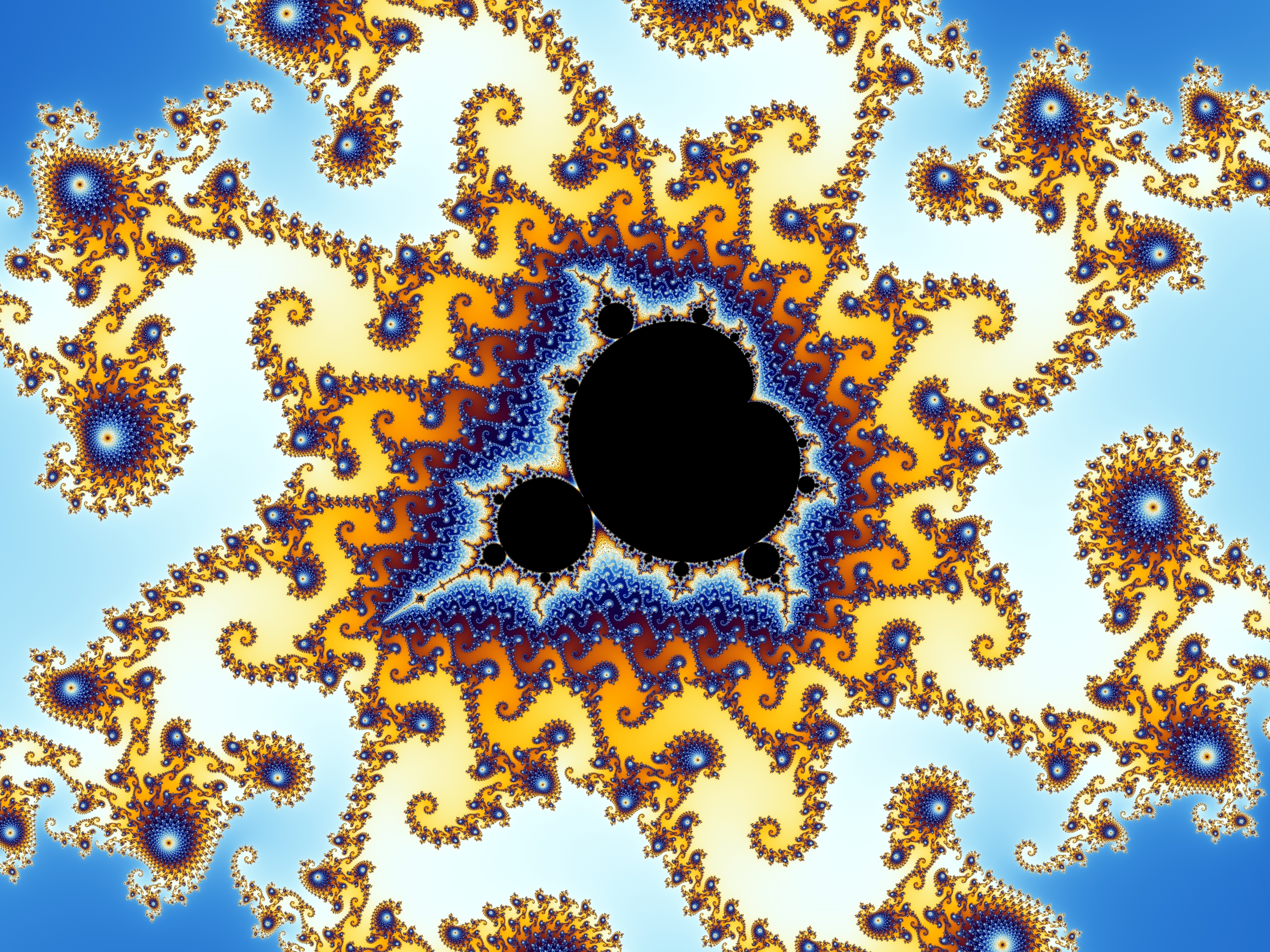
A detail of the Mandelbrot set. It is not known whether the Mandelbrot set is locally connected or not.

- Arnold–Givental conjecture and Arnold conjecture – relating symplectic geometry to Morse theory.
- Berry–Tabor conjecture in quantum chaos
- Banach's problem – is there an ergodic system with simple Lebesgue spectrum?
- Birkhoff conjecture – if a billiard table is strictly convex and integrable, is its boundary necessarily an ellipse?
- Collatz conjecture (also known as the $3n + 1$ conjecture)
- Eden's conjecture that the supremum of the local Lyapunov dimensions on the global attractor is achieved on a stationary point or an unstable periodic orbit embedded into the attractor.
- Fatou conjecture that a quadratic family of maps from the complex plane to itself is hyperbolic for an open dense set of parameters.
- Furstenberg conjecture – is every invariant and ergodic measure for the $\times 2,\times 3$ action on the circle either Lebesgue or atomic?
- Kaplan–Yorke conjecture on the dimension of an attractor in terms of its Lyapunov exponents
- Margulis conjecture – measure classification for diagonalizable actions in higher-rank groups.
- Hilbert–Arnold problem – is there a uniform bound on limit cycles in generic finite-parameter families of vector fields on a sphere?
- MLC conjecture – is the Mandelbrot set locally connected?
- Many problems concerning an outer billiard, for example showing that outer billiards relative to almost every convex polygon have unbounded orbits.
- Quantum unique ergodicity conjecture on the distribution of large-frequency eigenfunctions of the Laplacian on a negatively-curved manifold
- Rokhlin's multiple mixing problem – are all strongly mixing systems also strongly 3-mixing?
- Triangular billiards – does every triangle have a periodic billiards path?
- Weinstein conjecture – does a regular compact contact type level set of a Hamiltonian on a symplectic manifold carry at least one periodic orbit of the Hamiltonian flow?
- Does every positive integer generate a juggler sequence terminating at 1?
- Lyapunov function: Lyapunov's second method for stability – For what classes of ODEs, describing dynamical systems, does Lyapunov's second method, formulated in the classical and canonically generalized forms, define the necessary and sufficient conditions for the (asymptotical) stability of motion?
- Is every reversible cellular automaton in three or more dimensions locally reversible?

=== Games and puzzles ===
==== Combinatorial games ====
- Sudoku:
  - How many puzzles have exactly one solution?
  - How many puzzles with exactly one solution are minimal?
  - What is the maximum number of givens for a minimal puzzle?
- Tic-tac-toe variants:
  - Given the width of a tic-tac-toe board, what is the smallest dimension such that X is guaranteed to have a winning strategy? (See also Hales–Jewett theorem and n^{d} game)
- Chess:
  - What is the outcome of a perfectly played game of chess? (See also first-move advantage in chess)
- Go:
  - What is the perfect value of Komi?
- Set:
  - What is the largest possible cap set, as a function of $n$ in the $n$-dimensional affine space over the three-element field?
- Are the nim-sequences of all finite octal games eventually periodic?
- Is the nim-sequence of Grundy's game eventually periodic?

==== Games with imperfect information ====
- Rendezvous problem

=== Geometry ===
==== Algebraic geometry ====
- Abundance conjecture: if the canonical bundle of a projective variety with Kawamata log terminal singularities is nef, then it is semiample.
- Bass conjecture on the finite generation of certain algebraic K-groups.
- Bass–Quillen conjecture relating vector bundles over a regular Noetherian ring and over the polynomial ring $A[t_{1}, \ldots, t_{n}]$.
- Deligne conjecture: any one of numerous named for Pierre Deligne.
  - Deligne's conjecture on Hochschild cohomology about the operadic structure on Hochschild cochain complex.
- Dixmier conjecture: any endomorphism of the Weyl algebras $A_{1}$ and $A_{2}$ is an automorphism.
- Fröberg conjecture on the Hilbert functions of a set of forms.
- Fujita conjecture regarding the line bundle $K_{M} \otimes L^{\otimes m}$ constructed from a positive holomorphic line bundle $L$ on a compact complex manifold $M$ and the canonical line bundle $K_{M}$ of $M$
- General elephant problem: do general elephants have at most Du Val singularities?
- Hartshorne's conjectures
- In spherical or hyperbolic geometry, must polyhedra with the same volume and Dehn invariant be scissors-congruent?
- Jacobian conjecture for two-dimensional spaces: if a two-dimensional polynomial mapping over a characteristic-0 field has a constant nonzero Jacobian determinant, then does it have a regular (i.e. with polynomial components) inverse function?
- Maulik–Nekrasov–Okounkov–Pandharipande conjecture on an equivalence between Gromov–Witten theory and Donaldson–Thomas theory
- Nagata's conjecture on curves, specifically the minimal degree required for a plane algebraic curve to pass through a collection of very general points with prescribed multiplicities.
- Nagata–Biran conjecture that if $X$ is a smooth algebraic surface and $L$ is an ample line bundle on $X$ of degree $d$, then for sufficiently large $r$, the Seshadri constant satisfies $\varepsilon(p_1,\ldots,p_r;X,L) = d/\sqrt{r}$.
- Nakai conjecture: if a complex algebraic variety has a ring of differential operators generated by its contained derivations, then it must be smooth.
- Parshin's conjecture: the higher algebraic K-groups of any smooth projective variety defined over a finite field must vanish up to torsion.
- Section conjecture on splittings of group homomorphisms from fundamental groups of complete smooth curves over finitely-generated fields $k$ to the Galois group of $k$.
- Standard conjectures on algebraic cycles
- Tate conjecture on the connection between algebraic cycles on algebraic varieties and Galois representations on étale cohomology groups.
- Virasoro conjecture: a certain generating function encoding the Gromov–Witten invariants of a smooth projective variety is fixed by an action of half of the Virasoro algebra.
- Zariski multiplicity conjecture on the topological equisingularity and equimultiplicity of varieties at singular points
- Are infinite sequences of flips possible in dimensions greater than 3?
- Resolution of singularities in characteristic $p$

==== Covering and packing ====
- Borsuk's problem on upper and lower bounds for the number of smaller-diameter subsets needed to cover a bounded n-dimensional set.
- The covering problem of Rado: if the union of finitely many axis-parallel squares has unit area, how small can the largest area covered by a disjoint subset of squares be?
- The Erdős–Oler conjecture: when $n$ is a triangular number, packing $n-1$ circles in an equilateral triangle requires a triangle of the same size as packing $n$ circles.
- The disk covering problem about finding the smallest real number $r(n)$ such that $n$ disks of radius $r(n)$ can be arranged in such a way as to cover the unit disk.
- The kissing number problem for dimensions other than 1, 2, 3, 4, 8 and 24
- Reinhardt's conjecture: the smoothed octagon has the lowest maximum packing density of all centrally-symmetric convex plane sets
- Sphere packing problems, including the density of the densest packing in dimensions other than 1, 2, 3, 8 and 24, and its asymptotic behavior for high dimensions.
- Square packing in a square: what is the asymptotic growth rate of wasted space?
- Ulam's packing conjecture about the identity of the worst-packing convex solid
- The Tammes problem for numbers of nodes greater than 14 (except 24).

==== Differential geometry ====
- For which dimensions of sphere differential Poincaré conjecture is true?
- The spherical Bernstein's problem, a generalization of Bernstein's problem
- Carathéodory conjecture: any convex, closed, and twice-differentiable surface in three-dimensional Euclidean space admits at least two umbilical points.
- Cartan–Hadamard conjecture: can the classical isoperimetric inequality for subsets of Euclidean space be extended to spaces of nonpositive curvature, known as Cartan–Hadamard manifolds?
- Chern's conjecture (affine geometry) that the Euler characteristic of a compact affine manifold vanishes.
- Chern's conjecture for hypersurfaces in spheres, a number of closely related conjectures.
- Closed curve problem: find (explicit) necessary and sufficient conditions that determine when, given two periodic functions with the same period, the integral curve is closed.
- The filling area conjecture, that a hemisphere has the minimum area among shortcut-free surfaces in Euclidean space whose boundary forms a closed curve of given length
- The Hopf conjectures relating the curvature and Euler characteristic of higher-dimensional Riemannian manifolds
- Osserman conjecture: that every Osserman manifold is either flat or locally isometric to a rank-one symmetric space
- Yau's conjecture on the first eigenvalue that the first eigenvalue for the Laplace–Beltrami operator on an embedded minimal hypersurface of $S^{n+1}$ is $n$.

==== Discrete geometry ====
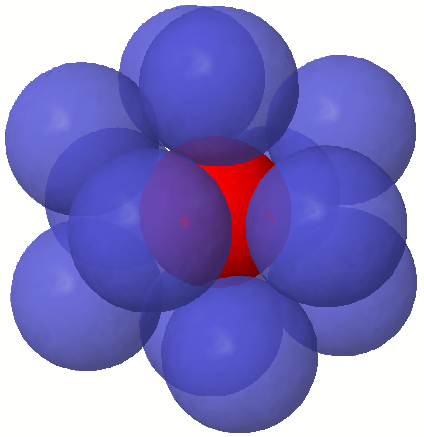
In three dimensions, the kissing number is 12, because 12 non-overlapping unit spheres can be put into contact with a central unit sphere. (Here, the centers of outer spheres form the vertices of a regular icosahedron.) Kissing numbers are only known exactly in dimensions 1, 2, 3, 4, 8 and 24.

- The big-line-big-clique conjecture on the existence of either many collinear points or many mutually visible points in large planar point sets
- The Dirac–Motzkin conjecture on the minimum number of ordinary lines for n points in the Euclidean plane
- The Hadwiger conjecture on covering n-dimensional convex bodies with at most 2^{n} smaller copies
- Solving the happy ending problem for arbitrary $n$
- Improving lower and upper bounds for the Heilbronn triangle problem.
- Kalai's 3^{d} conjecture on the least possible number of faces of centrally symmetric polytopes.
- The Kobon triangle problem on triangles in line arrangements
- The Kusner conjecture: at most $2d$ points can be equidistant in $L^1$ spaces
- The McMullen problem on projectively transforming sets of points into convex position
- Opaque forest problem on finding opaque sets for various planar shapes
- Orchard-planting problem on the maximum number of 3-point lines attainable by a configuration of n points in the plane
- How many unit distances can be determined by a set of n points in the Euclidean plane?
- Finding matching upper and lower bounds for k-sets and halving lines
  - For each arrangement of points in which the rectilinear crossing number is minimized, is the number of halving lines maximized?
- Tripod packing: how many tripods can have their apexes packed into a given cube?

==== Euclidean geometry ====
- The Atiyah conjecture on configurations on the invertibility of a certain $n$-by-$n$ matrix depending on $n$ points in $\mathbb{R}^{3}$
- Bellman's lost-in-a-forest problem – find the shortest route that is guaranteed to reach the boundary of a given shape, starting at an unknown point of the shape with unknown orientation
- Borromean rings — are there three unknotted space curves, not all three circles, which cannot be arranged to form this link?
- Connelly’s blooming conjecture: Does every net of a convex polyhedron have a blooming?
- Danzer's problem and Conway's dead fly problem – do Danzer sets of bounded density or bounded separation exist?
- Dissection into orthoschemes – is it possible for simplices of every dimension?
- Ehrhart's volume conjecture: a convex body $K$ in $n$ dimensions containing a single lattice point in its interior as its center of mass cannot have volume greater than $(n+1)^{n}/n!$
- Falconer's conjecture: sets of Hausdorff dimension greater than $d/2$ in $\mathbb{R}^d$ must have a distance set of nonzero Lebesgue measure
- The values of the Hermite constants for dimensions other than 1–8 and 24
- What is the lowest number of faces possible for a holyhedron?
- Inscribed square problem, also known as Toeplitz' conjecture and the square peg problem – does every Jordan curve have an inscribed square?
- The Kakeya conjecture – do $n$-dimensional sets that contain a unit line segment in every direction necessarily have Hausdorff dimension and Minkowski dimension equal to $n$? (Note: In 2025, Hong Wang and Joshua Zahl proved the conjecture in three dimensions, establishing full Hausdorff and Minkowski dimension. The conjecture remains open in higher dimensions. See Zahl, Joshua (2026). "A Survey of the Kakeya Conjecture, 2000–2025". Proceedings of the International Congress of Mathematicians 2026: 270–287. doi:10.1137/25M1805965. ISBN 978-1-61197-866-7..)
- The Kelvin problem on minimum-surface-area partitions of space into equal-volume cells, and the optimality of the Weaire–Phelan structure as a solution to the Kelvin problem
- Lebesgue's universal covering problem on the minimum-area convex shape in the plane that can cover any shape of diameter one
- Mahler's conjecture on the product of the volumes of a centrally symmetric convex body and its polar.
- In Meissner body):

- Are the two Meissner tetrahedra the minimum-volume three-dimensional shapes of constant width?

- Moser's worm problem – what is the smallest area of a shape that can cover every unit-length curve in the plane?
- The moving sofa problem – what is the largest area of a shape that can be maneuvered through a unit-width L-shaped corridor?
- In parallelohedron:
  - Can every spherical non-convex polyhedron that tiles space by translation have its faces grouped into patches with the same combinatorial structure as a parallelohedron?
  - Does every higher-dimensional tiling by translations of convex polytope tiles have an affine transformation taking it to a Voronoi diagram?
- Ropelength problems:
  - Is there a general expression for the minimum ropelength of an arbitrary closed knot?
  - What constant $1.1 < a \leq 10.76$ governs the lower bound of a closed knot $K$'s minimum ropelength $L(K) \geq a\operatorname{Cr}(K)^{3/4}$?
  - Is the upper bound of a closed knot's minimum ropelength linear to its crossing number?
  - Is there a general expression for how much the ends of a long rope of radius 1 get closer when a tight open knot is tied into it?
- Does every convex polyhedron have Rupert's property?
- Shephard's problem (a.k.a. Dürer's conjecture) – does every convex polyhedron have a net, or simple edge-unfolding?
- Is there a non-convex polyhedron without self-intersections with more than seven faces, each of which shares exactly one edge with each other?
- The Thomson problem – what is the minimum energy configuration of $n$ mutually-repelling particles on a unit sphere?
- Convex uniform 5-polytopes – find and classify the complete set of these shapes

==== Non-Euclidean geometry ====
- Hilbert's third problem for non-Euclidean geometries: in spherical or hyperbolic geometry, must polyhedra with the same volume and Dehn invariant be scissors-congruent?

=== Graph theory ===
==== Algebraic graph theory ====
- Babai's problem: which groups are Babai invariant groups?
- Brouwer's conjecture on upper bounds for sums of eigenvalues of Laplacians of graphs in terms of their number of edges

==== Games on graphs ====
- γ–θ conjecture: Does there exist a graph $G$ such that the dominating number, eternal domination number, and clique covering number satisfy $\gamma(G)=\gamma_\infty(G)<\theta(G)$?
- Graham's pebbling conjecture on the pebbling number of Cartesian products of graphs
- Meyniel's conjecture that cop number is $O(\sqrt n)$
- Suppose Alice has a winning strategy for the vertex coloring game on a graph $G$ with $k$ colors. Does she have one for $k+1$ colors?

==== Graph coloring and labeling ====
An instance of the Erdős–Faber–Lovász conjecture: a graph formed from four cliques of four vertices each, any two of which intersect in a single vertex, can be four-colored.

- The 1-factorization conjecture that if $n$ is odd or even and $k \geq n, n - 1$, respectively, then a $k$-regular graph with $2n$ vertices is 1-factorable.
  - The perfect 1-factorization conjecture that every complete graph on an even number of vertices admits a perfect 1-factorization.
- Cereceda's conjecture on the diameter of the space of colorings of degenerate graphs
- The Earth–Moon problem: what is the maximum chromatic number of biplanar graphs?
- The Erdős–Faber–Lovász conjecture on coloring unions of cliques
- The graceful tree conjecture that every tree admits a graceful labeling
  - Rosa's conjecture that all triangular cacti are graceful or nearly-graceful
- The Gyárfás–Sumner conjecture on χ-boundedness of graphs with a forbidden induced tree
- The Hadwiger conjecture relating coloring to clique minors
- The Hadwiger–Nelson problem on the chromatic number of unit distance graphs
- The list coloring conjecture: for every graph, the list chromatic index equals the chromatic index
- The overfull conjecture that a graph with maximum degree $\Delta(G) \geq n/3$ is class 2 if and only if it has an overfull subgraph $S$ satisfying $\Delta(S) = \Delta(G)$.
- The total coloring conjecture of Behzad and Vizing that the total chromatic number is at most two plus the maximum degree

==== Graph drawing and embedding ====
- The Albertson conjecture: the crossing number can be lower-bounded by the crossing number of a complete graph with the same chromatic number
- Conway's thrackle conjecture that thrackles cannot have more edges than vertices
- The GNRS conjecture on whether minor-closed graph families have $\ell_1$ embeddings with bounded distortion
- Harborth's conjecture: every planar graph can be drawn with integer edge lengths
- Negami's conjecture on projective-plane embeddings of graphs with planar covers
- The strong Papadimitriou–Ratajczak conjecture: every polyhedral graph has a convex greedy embedding
- Turán's brick factory problem – Is there a drawing of any complete bipartite graph with fewer crossings than the number given by Zarankiewicz?
- Guy's conjecture on the crossing number for complete graphs – Is there a drawing of any complete graph with fewer crossings than the number given by his upper bound?
- Universal point sets of subquadratic size for planar graphs

==== Restriction of graph parameters ====
- Does there exist a conference graph for every number of vertices $v>1$ where $v \equiv 1 \bmod 4$ and $v$ is an odd sum of two squares?
- Conway's 99-graph problem: does there exist a strongly regular graph with parameters $(99,14,1,2)$?
- Degree diameter problem: given two positive integers $d, k$, what is the largest graph of diameter $k$ such that all vertices have degrees at most $d$?
- Jørgensen's conjecture that every 6-vertex-connected $K_6$-minor-free graph is an apex graph
- Does a Moore graph with girth 5 and degree 57 exist?
- Do there exist infinitely many strongly regular geodetic graphs, or any strongly regular geodetic graphs that are not Moore graphs?

==== Subgraphs ====
- Barnette's conjecture: every cubic bipartite three-connected planar graph has a Hamiltonian cycle
- Gilbert–Pollak conjecture on the Steiner ratio of the Euclidean plane that the Steiner ratio is $\sqrt{3}/2$
- Chvátal's toughness conjecture, that there is a number t such that every t-tough graph is Hamiltonian
- The cycle double cover conjecture: every bridgeless graph has a family of cycles that includes each edge twice
- The Erdős–Gyárfás conjecture on cycles with power-of-two lengths in cubic graphs
- The Erdős–Hajnal conjecture on large cliques or independent sets in graphs with a forbidden induced subgraph
- The Grünbaum–Nash-Williams conjecture on whether every 4-vertex-connected toroidal graph has a Hamiltonian cycle.
- The linear arboricity conjecture on decomposing graphs into disjoint unions of paths according to their maximum degree
- The Lovász conjecture on Hamiltonian paths in symmetric graphs
- The Oberwolfach problem on which 2-regular graphs have the property that a complete graph on the same number of vertices can be decomposed into edge-disjoint copies of the given graph.
- What is the largest possible pathwidth of an n-vertex cubic graph?
- The reconstruction conjecture and new digraph reconstruction conjecture on whether a graph is uniquely determined by its vertex-deleted subgraphs.
- The snake-in-the-box problem: what is the longest possible induced path in an $n$-dimensional hypercube graph?
- Sumner's conjecture: does every $(2n-2)$-vertex tournament contain as a subgraph every $n$-vertex oriented tree?
- Szymanski's conjecture: every permutation on the $n$-dimensional doubly-directed hypercube graph can be routed with edge-disjoint paths.
- Tuza's conjecture: if the maximum number of disjoint triangles is $\nu$, can all triangles be hit by a set of at most $2\nu$ edges?
- The unfriendly partition conjecture: Does every countable graph have an unfriendly partition into two parts?
- Vizing's conjecture on the domination number of cartesian products of graphs
- Walescki's theorem for hypergraphs: Do complete $k$-uniform hypergraphs admit Hamiltonian decompositions into tight cycles?
- Zarankiewicz problem: how many edges can there be in a bipartite graph on a given number of vertices with no complete bipartite subgraphs of a given size?

==== Word-representation of graphs ====
- Are there any graphs on n vertices whose representation requires more than floor(n/2) copies of each letter?
- Characterise (non-)word-representable planar graphs
- Characterise word-representable graphs in terms of (induced) forbidden subgraphs.
- Characterise word-representable near-triangulations containing the complete graph K_{4} (such a characterisation is known for K_{4}-free planar graphs)
- Classify graphs with representation number 3, that is, graphs that can be represented using 3 copies of each letter, but cannot be represented using 2 copies of each letter
- Is it true that out of all bipartite graphs, crown graphs require longest word-representants?
- Is the line graph of a non-word-representable graph always non-word-representable?
- Which (hard) problems on graphs can be translated to words representing them and solved on words (efficiently)?

==== Miscellaneous graph theory ====
- Delta-conjecture (1978): consider a complete graph $(V; E_1, \dots, E_d)$ each edge of which is colored by one of $d$ colors such that there exists a triangle $\Delta$ colored in three pairwise distinct colors. Then, in each chromatic component $(V, E_i), i = 1, \dots, d$, one can choose a maximal independent vertex-set such that the intersection of the obtained $d$ sets is empty.
- The imbalance conjecture: If the imbalance for each edge of a graph is at least 1, is the multiset of all edge imbalances always graphic?
- The implicit graph conjecture on the existence of implicit representations for slowly-growing hereditary families of graphs
- Ryser's conjecture relating the maximum matching size and minimum transversal size in hypergraphs
- The second neighborhood problem: does every oriented graph contain a vertex for which there are at least as many other vertices at distance two as at distance one?
- Sidorenko's conjecture on homomorphism densities of graphs in graphons
- Teschner's bondage number conjecture: is the bondage number of a graph always less than or equal to 3/2 times its maximum degree?
- Tutte's conjectures:
  - every bridgeless graph has a nowhere-zero 5-flow
  - every Petersen-minor-free bridgeless graph has a nowhere-zero 4-flow
- Woodall's conjecture that the minimum number of edges in a dicut of a directed graph is equal to the maximum number of disjoint dijoins.

=== Model theory and formal languages ===
- The Cherlin–Zilber conjecture: A simple group whose first-order theory is stable in $\aleph_0$ is a simple algebraic group over an algebraically closed field.
- Generalized star height problem: can all regular languages be expressed using generalized regular expressions with limited nesting depths of Kleene stars?
- For which number fields does Hilbert's tenth problem hold?
- Kueker's conjecture
- The main gap conjecture, e.g. for uncountable first order theories, for AECs, and for $\aleph_1$-saturated models of a countable theory.
- Shelah's categoricity conjecture for $L_{\omega_1,\omega}$: If a sentence is categorical above the Hanf number then it is categorical in all cardinals above the Hanf number.
- Shelah's eventual categoricity conjecture: For every cardinal $\lambda$ there exists a cardinal $\mu(\lambda)$ such that if an AEC K with LS(K)${} \le \lambda$ is categorical in a cardinal above $\mu(\lambda)$ then it is categorical in all cardinals above $\mu(\lambda)$.
- The stable field conjecture: every infinite field with a stable first-order theory is separably closed.
- The stable forking conjecture for simple theories
- Tarski's exponential function problem: is the theory of the real numbers with the exponential function decidable?
- The universality problem for C-free graphs: For which finite sets C of graphs does the class of C-free countable graphs have a universal member under strong embeddings?
- The universality spectrum problem: Is there a first-order theory whose universality spectrum is minimum?
- Vaught conjecture: the number of countable models of a first-order complete theory in a countable language is either finite, $\aleph_0$, or $2^{\aleph_0}$.
- Assume K is the class of models of a countable first order theory omitting countably many types. If K has a model of cardinality $\aleph_{\omega_1}$ does it have a model of cardinality continuum?
- Do the Henson graphs have the finite model property?
- Does a finitely presented homogeneous structure for a finite relational language have finitely many reducts?
- Does there exist an o-minimal first order theory with a trans-exponential (rapid growth) function?
- If the class of atomic models of a complete first order theory is categorical in the $\aleph_n$, is it categorical in every cardinal?
- Is every infinite, minimal field of characteristic zero algebraically closed? (Here, "minimal" means that every definable subset of the structure is finite or co-finite.)
- Is the Borel monadic theory of the real order (BMTO) decidable? Is the monadic theory of well-ordering (MTWO) consistently decidable?
- Is the theory of the field of Laurent series over $\mathbb{Z}_p$ decidable? of the field of polynomials over $\mathbb{C}$?
- Is there a logic L which satisfies both the Beth property and Δ-interpolation, is compact but does not satisfy the interpolation property?
- Determine the structure of Keisler's order.
- What is the nature of the proof-theoretic ordinal (the smallest ordinal a theory cannot prove well-founded) for second-order arithmetic, ZFC, or stronger theories?

=== Probability theory ===
- Ibragimov–Iosifescu conjecture for φ-mixing sequences

=== Number theory ===
==== General ====
6 is a perfect number because it is the sum of its proper positive divisors, 1, 2 and 3. It is not known how many perfect numbers there are, nor if any of them is odd.

- Büchi's problem on sufficiently large sequences of square numbers with constant second difference.
- Carmichael's totient function conjecture: do all values of Euler's totient function have multiplicity greater than $1$?
- Catalan–Dickson conjecture on aliquot sequences: no aliquot sequences are infinite but non-repeating.
- Exponent pair conjecture: for all $\varepsilon > 0$, is the pair $(\varepsilon, 1/2 + \varepsilon)$ an exponent pair?
- The Gauss circle problem: how far can the number of integer points in a circle centered at the origin be from the area of the circle?
- Grimm's conjecture: each element of a set of consecutive composite numbers can be assigned a distinct prime number that divides it.
- Hall's conjecture: for any $\varepsilon > 0$, there is some constant $c(\varepsilon)$ such that either $y^2 = x^3$ or $|y^2 - x^3| > c(\varepsilon)x^{1/2 - \varepsilon}$.
- Lehmer's totient problem: if $\phi(n)$ divides $n - 1$, must $n$ be prime?
- Magic square of squares: is there a 3x3 magic square composed of distinct perfect squares?
- Mahler's 3/2 problem that no real number $x$ has the property that the fractional parts of $x(3/2)^n$ are less than $1/2$ for all positive integers $n$.
- Newman's conjecture: the partition function satisfies any arbitrary congruence infinitely often.
- Scholz conjecture: the length of the shortest addition chain producing $2^n - 1$ is at most $n - 1$ plus the length of the shortest addition chain producing $n$.
- Singmaster's conjecture: is there a finite upper bound on the multiplicities of the entries greater than 1 in Pascal's triangle?
- Sister Beiter conjecture: the maximal coefficient of a ternary cyclotomic polynomial is bounded by $2/3$ of the smallest prime factor of its index.
- Are there infinitely many perfect numbers?
- Do any odd perfect numbers exist?
- Do quasiperfect numbers exist?
- Do any non-power of 2 almost perfect numbers exist?
- Are there 65, 66, or 67 idoneal numbers?
- Are there any pairs of amicable numbers which have opposite parity?
- Are there any pairs of betrothed numbers which have same parity?
- Are there any pairs of relatively prime amicable numbers?
- Are there infinitely many pairs of amicable numbers?
- Are there infinitely many betrothed numbers?
- Are there infinitely many Giuga numbers?
- Do any Lychrel numbers exist in base 10?
- Do any odd noncototients exist?
- Do any odd weird numbers exist?
- Do any (2, 5)-perfect numbers exist?
- Do any Taxicab(5, 2, n) exist for n > 1?
- Is there a covering system with odd distinct moduli?
- Is $\pi$ a normal number (i.e., is each digit 0–9 equally frequent)?
- Are all irrational algebraic numbers normal?
- Is 10 a solitary number?

==== Additive number theory ====
- Erdős conjecture on arithmetic progressions that if the sum of the reciprocals of the members of a set of positive integers diverges, then the set contains arbitrarily long arithmetic progressions.
- Erdős–Turán conjecture on additive bases: if $B$ is an additive basis of order $2$, then the number of ways that positive integers $n$ can be expressed as the sum of two numbers in $B$ must tend to infinity as $n$ tends to infinity.
- Gilbreath's conjecture on consecutive applications of the unsigned forward difference operator to the sequence of prime numbers.
- Goldbach's conjecture: every even natural number greater than $2$ is the sum of two prime numbers.
- Lander, Parkin, and Selfridge conjecture: if the sum of $m$ $k$-th powers of positive integers is equal to a different sum of $n$ $k$-th powers of positive integers, then $m + n \geq k$.
- Lemoine's conjecture: all odd integers greater than $5$ can be represented as the sum of an odd prime number and an even semiprime.
- Minimum overlap problem of estimating the minimum possible maximum number of times a number appears in the termwise difference of two equally large sets partitioning the set $\{1, \ldots, 2n\}$
- Pollock's conjectures
- Does every nonnegative integer appear in Recamán's sequence?
- Skolem problem: can an algorithm determine if a constant-recursive sequence contains a zero?
- The values of g(k) and G(k) in Waring's problem
- Do the Ulam numbers have a positive density?
- Determine growth rate of r_{k}(N) (see Szemerédi's theorem)

==== Algebraic number theory ====
- Class number problem: are there infinitely many real quadratic number fields with unique factorization?
- Fontaine–Mazur conjecture: actually numerous conjectures, all proposed by Jean-Marc Fontaine and Barry Mazur.
- Gan–Gross–Prasad conjecture: a restriction problem in representation theory of real or p-adic Lie groups.
- Greenberg's conjectures
- Hermite's problem: is it possible, for any natural number $n$, to assign a sequence of natural numbers to each real number such that the sequence for $x$ is eventually periodic if and only if $x$ is algebraic of degree $n$?
- Hilbert's 9th problem: find the most general reciprocity law for the norm residues of $k$-th order in a general algebraic number field, where $k$ is a power of a prime.
- Hilbert's 12th problem: extend the Kronecker–Weber theorem on Abelian extensions of $\mathbb{Q}$ to any base number field.
- Kummer–Vandiver conjecture: primes $p$ do not divide the class number of the maximal real subfield of the $p$-th cyclotomic field.
- Lang and Trotter's conjecture on supersingular primes that the number of supersingular primes less than a constant $X$ is within a constant multiple of $\sqrt{X}/\ln{X}$
- Leopoldt's conjecture: a p-adic analogue of the regulator of an algebraic number field does not vanish.
- Stark conjectures (including Brumer–Stark conjecture)
- Characterize all algebraic number fields that have some power basis.

==== Analytic number theory ====
- Beilinson's conjectures about special values of L-functions.
- Do Siegel zeros exist?
- Find the value of the De Bruijn–Newman constant.
- Is Selberg class of Dirichlet series equal to class of automorphic L-functions?
- Hardy–Littlewood zeta function conjectures
- Keating–Snaith conjecture concerning the asymptotics of an integral involving the Riemann zeta function
- Hilbert–Pólya conjecture: the nontrivial zeros of the Riemann zeta function correspond to eigenvalues of a self-adjoint operator.
- Lindelöf hypothesis that for all $\varepsilon > 0$, $\zeta(1/2 + it) = o(t^\varepsilon)$
  - The density hypothesis for zeroes of the Riemann zeta function.
- Location of nontrivial zeros of L-functions, especially conjectures concerning their critical lines:
  - Grand Riemann hypothesis: do the nontrivial zeros of all automorphic L-functions lie on the critical line $1/2 + it$ with real $t$?
  - Generalized Riemann hypothesis for Selberg class: do the nontrivial zeros of all functions in Selberg class lie on the critical line $1/2 + it$ with real $t$?
  - Extended Riemann Hypothesis: do the nontrivial zeros of all Dedekind zeta functions lie on the critical line $1/2 + it$ with real $t$?
  - Generalized Riemann hypothesis: do the nontrivial zeros of all Dirichlet L-functions lie on the critical line $1/2 + it$ with real $t$?
  - Riemann hypothesis: do the nontrivial zeros of the Riemann zeta function lie on the critical line $1/2 + it$ with real $t$?
- Montgomery's pair correlation conjecture: the normalized pair correlation function between pairs of zeros of the Riemann zeta function is the same as the pair correlation function of random Hermitian matrices.
- Piltz divisor problem on bounding $\Delta_k(x) = D_k(x) - xP_k(\log(x))$
  - Dirichlet's divisor problem: the specific case of the Piltz divisor problem for: $k = 1$
- Ramanujan–Petersson conjecture: a number of generalizations of the original conjecture, concerning growth rate of coefficients of automorphic forms.
- Selberg's 1/4 conjecture: the eigenvalues of the Laplace operator on Maass wave forms of congruence subgroups are at least $1/4$.
- Selberg's orthogonality conjecture: generalization of Mertens' theorem for functions in Selberg class.

==== Arithmetic geometry ====
- Bombieri–Lang conjecture: $K$-rational points on a variety of general type over a number field $K$ are not a dense set in Zariski topology.
- Erdős–Ulam problem: Is there a dense set of points in the plane all at rational distances from one another?
- Manin conjecture: if K-rational points on Fano variety are Zariski-dense subset, then the distribution of points of height: $H(x)\leq B$ in any Zariski-open subset $U$ is proportional to $B \log (B)^{r-1}$, where $r$ is rank of Picard group of that variety.
- Sato–Tate conjecture: also a number of related conjectures that are generalizations of the original conjecture.
- In Unit square:
  - Rational dense problem: Is there a point in the plane at a rational distance from all four corners of a unit square?
- Vojta's conjecture: points on non-singular algebraic variety over algebraic number field that not satisfy certain height inequality are contained in some Zariski-closed set.
- n conjecture: a generalization of the abc conjecture to more than three integers.
  - abc conjecture: for any $\varepsilon > 0$, $\operatorname{rad}(abc)^{1+\varepsilon} < c$ is true for only finitely many positive $a, b, c$ such that $a + b = c$.
  - Szpiro's conjecture: for any $\varepsilon > 0$, there is some constant $C(\varepsilon)$ such that, for any elliptic curve $E$ defined over $\mathbb{Q}$ with minimal discriminant $\Delta$ and conductor $f$, we have $|\Delta| \leq C(\varepsilon) \cdot f^{6+\varepsilon}$.
- Zilber–Pink conjecture that if $X$ is a mixed Shimura variety or semiabelian variety defined over $\mathbb{C}$, and $V \subseteq X$ is a subvariety, then $V$ contains only finitely many maximal atypical subvarieties.

==== Computational number theory ====
- Can integer factorization be done in polynomial time?
- Can a discrete logarithm be computed in polynomial time?
  - Can a discrete logarithm on a elliptic curve be computed in sub-exponential time?
- Does every rational number with an odd denominator have an odd greedy expansion?

==== Diophantine approximation and transcendental number theory ====
The area of the blue region converges to the Euler–Mascheroni constant, which may or may not be a rational number.

- Littlewood conjecture: for any two real numbers $\alpha, \beta$, $\liminf_{n \rightarrow \infty} n\,\Vert n\alpha\Vert\,\Vert n\beta\Vert = 0$, where $\Vert x\Vert$ is the distance from $x$ to the nearest integer.
- Schanuel's conjecture on the transcendence degree of certain field extensions of the rational numbers. In particular: Are $\pi$ and $e$ algebraically independent? Which nontrivial combinations of transcendental numbers (such as $e + \pi, e\pi, \pi^e, \pi^{\pi}, e^e$) are themselves transcendental?
- The four exponentials conjecture: the transcendence of at least one of four exponentials of combinations of irrationals
- Are Euler's constant $\gamma$ and Catalan's constant $G$ irrational? Are they transcendental? Is Apéry's constant $\zeta(3)$ transcendental?
- Which transcendental numbers are (exponential) periods?
- How well can non-quadratic irrational numbers be approximated? What is the irrationality measure of specific (suspected) transcendental numbers such as $\pi$ and $\gamma$?
- Which irrational numbers have simple continued fraction terms whose geometric mean converges to Khinchin's constant?
- Hartmanis–Stearns conjecture

==== Diophantine equations ====
- Beal's conjecture: for all integral solutions to $A^x + B^y = C^z$ where $x, y, z > 2$, all three numbers $A, B, C$ must share some prime factor.
- Brocard's problem: are there any integer solutions to $n! + 1 = m^{2}$ other than $n = 4, 5, 7$?
- Congruent number problem (a corollary to Birch and Swinnerton-Dyer conjecture, per Tunnell's theorem): determine precisely what rational numbers are congruent numbers.
- Erdős–Moser problem: is $1^1 + 2^1 = 3^1$ the only solution to the Erdős–Moser equation?
- Erdős–Straus conjecture: for every $n \geq 2$, there are positive integers $x, y, z$ such that $4/n = 1/x + 1/y + 1/z$.
- Fermat–Catalan conjecture: there are finitely many distinct solutions $(a^m, b^n, c^k)$ to the equation $a^m + b^n = c^k$ with $a, b, c$ being positive coprime integers and $m, n, k$ being positive integers satisfying $1/m + 1/n + 1/k < 1$.
- Goormaghtigh conjecture on solutions to $(x^m - 1)/(x - 1) = (y^n - 1)/(y - 1)$ where $x > y > 1$ and $m, n > 2$.
- The uniqueness conjecture for Markov numbers that every Markov number is the largest number in exactly one normalized solution to the Markov Diophantine equation.
- Pillai's conjecture: for any $A, B, C$, the equation $Ax^m - By^n = C$ has finitely many solutions when $m, n$ are not both $2$.
- Which integers can be written as the sum of three perfect cubes?
- Can every integer be written as a sum of four perfect cubes?

==== Prime numbers ====
Goldbach's conjecture states that all even integers greater than 2 can be written as the sum of two primes. Here this is illustrated for the even integers from 4 to 28.

- Agoh–Giuga conjecture on the Bernoulli numbers that $p$ is prime if and only if $pB_{p-1} \equiv -1 \pmod p$
- Agrawal's conjecture that given coprime positive integers $n$ and $r$, if $(X - 1)^n \equiv X^n - 1 \pmod{n, X^r - 1}$, then either $n$ is prime or $n^{2} \equiv 1 \pmod{r}$
- Artin's conjecture on primitive roots that if an integer is neither a perfect square nor $-1$, then it is a primitive root modulo infinitely many prime numbers $p$
- Brocard's conjecture: there are always at least $4$ prime numbers between consecutive squares of prime numbers, aside from $2^{2}$ and $3^{2}$.
- Bunyakovsky conjecture: if an integer-coefficient polynomial $f$ has a positive leading coefficient, is irreducible over the integers, and has no common factors over all $f(x)$ where $x$ is a positive integer, then $f(x)$ is prime infinitely often.
- Catalan's Mersenne conjecture: some Catalan–Mersenne number is composite and thus all Catalan–Mersenne numbers are composite after some point.
- Dickson's conjecture: for a finite set of linear forms $a_1 + b_1 n, \ldots, a_k + b_k n$ with each $b_i \geq 1$, there are infinitely many $n$ for which all forms are prime, unless there is some congruence condition preventing it.
- Dubner's conjecture: every even number greater than $4208$ is the sum of two primes which both have a twin.
- Elliott–Halberstam conjecture on the distribution of prime numbers in arithmetic progressions.
- Erdős–Mollin–Walsh conjecture: no three consecutive numbers are all powerful.
- Feit–Thompson conjecture: for all distinct prime numbers $p$ and $q$, $(p^q - 1)/(p - 1)$ does not divide $(q^p - 1)/(q - 1)$
- Fortune's conjecture that no Fortunate number is composite.
- The Gaussian moat problem: is it possible to find an infinite sequence of distinct Gaussian prime numbers such that the difference between consecutive numbers in the sequence is bounded?
- Gillies' conjecture on the distribution of prime divisors of Mersenne numbers.
- Landau's problems
  - Goldbach conjecture: all even natural numbers greater than $2$ are the sum of two prime numbers.
  - Legendre's conjecture: for every positive integer $n$, there is a prime between $n^{2}$ and $(n+1)^{2}$.
  - Twin prime conjecture: there are infinitely many twin primes.
  - Are there infinitely many primes of the form $n^{2} + 1$?
- Problems associated to Linnik's theorem
- New Mersenne conjecture: for any odd natural number $p$, if any two of the three conditions $p = 2^k \pm 1$ or $p = 4^k \pm 3$, $2^p - 1$ is prime, and $(2^{p} + 1)/3$ is prime are true, then the third condition is also true.
- Polignac's conjecture: for all positive even numbers $n$, there are infinitely many prime gaps of size $n$.
- Schinzel's hypothesis H that for every finite collection $\{f_1, \ldots, f_k\}$ of nonconstant irreducible polynomials over the integers with positive leading coefficients, either there are infinitely many positive integers $n$ for which $f_1(n), \ldots, f_k(n)$ are all primes, or there is some fixed divisor $m > 1$ which, for all $n$, divides some $f_i(n)$.
- Selfridge's conjecture: is 78,557 the lowest Sierpiński number?
- Does the converse of Wolstenholme's theorem hold for all natural numbers?
- Are all Euclid numbers square-free?
- Are all Fermat numbers square-free?
- Are all Mersenne numbers of prime index square-free?
- Are there any composite c satisfying 2^{c − 1} ≡ 1 (mod c^{2})?
- Are there any Wall–Sun–Sun primes?
- Are there any Wieferich primes in base 47?
- Are there infinitely many balanced primes?
- Are there infinitely many cluster primes?
- Are there infinitely many cousin primes?
- Are there infinitely many Cullen primes?
- Are there infinitely many Euclid primes?
- Are there infinitely many Fibonacci primes?
- Are there infinitely many Kummer primes?
- Are there infinitely many Kynea primes?
- Are there infinitely many Lucas primes?
- Are there infinitely many Mersenne primes (Lenstra–Pomerance–Wagstaff conjecture); equivalently, infinitely many even perfect numbers?
- Are there infinitely many Newman–Shanks–Williams primes?
- Are there infinitely many palindromic primes to every base?
- Are there infinitely many Pell primes?
- Are there infinitely many Pierpont primes?
- Are there infinitely many prime quadruplets?
- Are there infinitely many prime triplets?
- Siegel's conjecture: are there infinitely many regular primes, and if so is their natural density as a subset of all primes $e^{-1/2}$?
- Are there infinitely many sexy primes?
- Are there infinitely many safe and Sophie Germain primes?
- Are there infinitely many Wagstaff primes?
- Are there infinitely many Wieferich primes?
- Are there infinitely many Wilson primes?
- Are there infinitely many Wolstenholme primes?
- Are there infinitely many Woodall primes?
- Can a prime p satisfy $2^{p-1}\equiv 1\pmod{p^2}$ and $3^{p-1}\equiv 1\pmod{p^2}$ simultaneously?
- Does every prime number appear in the Euclid–Mullin sequence?
- What is the smallest Skewes's number?
- For any given integer a > 0, are there infinitely many Lucas–Wieferich primes associated with the pair (a, −1)? (Specially, when a = 1, this is the Fibonacci-Wieferich primes, and when a = 2, this is the Pell-Wieferich primes)
- For any given integer a > 0, are there infinitely many primes p such that a^{p − 1} ≡ 1 (mod p^{2})?
- For any given integer b which is not a perfect power and not of the form −4k^{4} for integer k, are there infinitely many repunit primes to base b?
- For any given integers $k\geq 1, b\geq 2, c\neq 0$, with gcd(k, c) = 1 and gcd(b, c) = 1, are there infinitely many primes of the form $(k\times b^n+c)/\gcd(k+c,b-1)$ with integer n ≥ 1?
- Is every Fermat number $2^{2^n} + 1$ composite for $n > 4$?
- Is 509,203 the lowest Riesel number?

=== Set theory ===
The following conjectures are expressed in the first-order language of axiomatic set theory and, unless stated otherwise, are here taken to be over Zermelo-Frankel set theory, possibly with Choice. In particular, the conjecture's independence may not be open in set theories with a wider or conflicting class of models, such as the various constructive resp. non-wellfounded set theories, etc.

- Does the partition principle (PP) imply the axiom of choice (AC)?
- (Woodin) Does the generalized continuum hypothesis below a strongly compact cardinal imply the generalized continuum hypothesis everywhere?
- Does the generalized continuum hypothesis entail ${\diamondsuit(E^{\lambda^+}_{\operatorname{cf}(\lambda)}})$ for every singular cardinal $\lambda$?
- Does the generalized continuum hypothesis imply the existence of an ℵ_{2}-Suslin tree?
- If ℵ_{ω} is a strong limit cardinal, is $2^{\aleph_\omega} < \aleph_{\omega_1}$ (see Singular cardinals hypothesis)? The best bound, ℵ_{ω_{4}}, was obtained by Shelah using his PCF theory.
- The problem of finding the ultimate core model, one that contains all large cardinals.
- Woodin's Ω-conjecture: if there is a proper class of Woodin cardinals, then Ω-logic satisfies an analogue of Gödel's completeness theorem.
- Does the consistency of the existence of a strongly compact cardinal imply the consistent existence of a supercompact cardinal?
- Does there exist a Jónsson algebra on ℵ_{ω}?
- Is OCA (the open coloring axiom) consistent with $2^{\aleph_{0}}>\aleph_{2}$?
- Reinhardt cardinals: Without assuming the axiom of choice, can a nontrivial elementary embedding V→V exist?

=== Topology ===
The unknotting problem asks whether there is an efficient algorithm to identify when the shape presented in a knot diagram is actually the unknot.

- Baum–Connes conjecture: the assembly map is an isomorphism.
- Berge conjecture that the only knots in the 3-sphere which admit lens space surgeries are Berge knots.
- Bing–Borsuk conjecture: every $n$-dimensional homogeneous absolute neighborhood retract is a topological manifold.
- Borel conjecture: aspherical and closed manifolds are determined up to homeomorphism by their fundamental groups.
- Halperin conjecture on rational Serre spectral sequences of certain fibrations.
- Hilbert–Smith conjecture: if a locally compact topological group has a continuous, faithful group action on a topological manifold, then the group must be a Lie group.
- Mazur's conjectures
- Novikov conjecture on the homotopy invariance of certain polynomials in the Pontryagin classes of a manifold, arising from the fundamental group.
- Quadrisecants of wild knots: it has been conjectured that wild knots always have infinitely many quadrisecants.
- Telescope conjecture: the last of Ravenel's conjectures in stable homotopy theory to be resolved.
- Unknotting problem: can unknots be recognized in polynomial time?
- Volume conjecture relating quantum invariants of knots to the hyperbolic geometry of their knot complements.
- Whitehead conjecture: every connected subcomplex of a two-dimensional aspherical CW complex is aspherical.
- Zeeman conjecture: given a finite contractible two-dimensional CW complex $K$, is the space $K \times [0, 1]$ collapsible?
- Nearby Lagrangian conjecture: prove or find a counter-example to the statement: Any closed exact Lagrangian submanifold of the cotangent bundle of a closed manifold is Hamiltonian isotopic to the zero section.

== Problems solved since 2015 ==
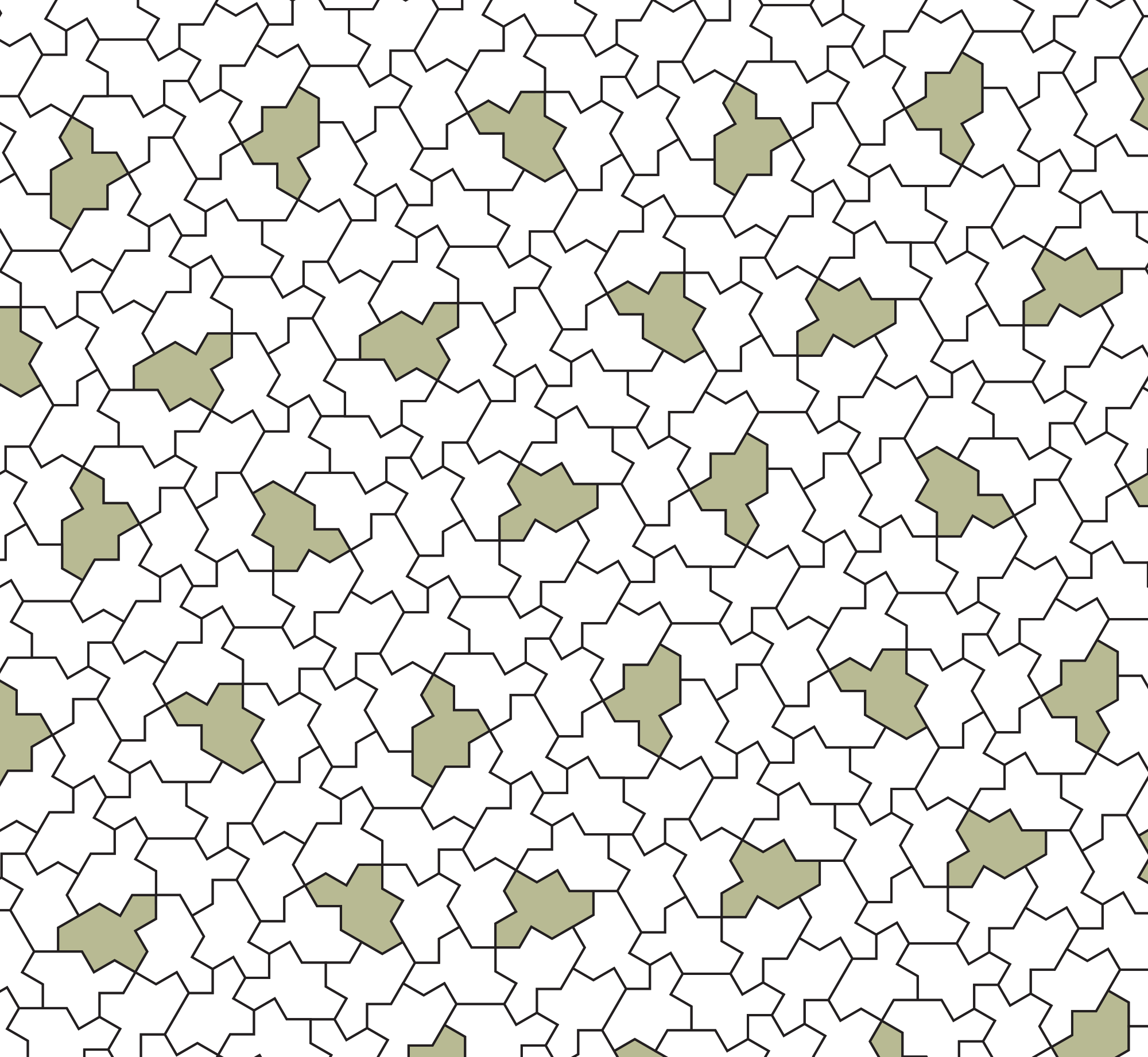
The Einstein problem asks whether aperiodic monotiles, like the Tile(1,1) pictured here, exist.

=== Algebra ===
- Disproof of the Jacobian conjecture for more than 2 dimensions (Levent Alpöge, 2026 using Claude Fable 5).
  - Disproof of the Dixmier conjecture for $n \geq 3$, stably equivalent to the Jacobian conjecture.
- Mazur's conjecture B (Vessilin Dimitrov, Ziyang Gao, and Philipp Habegger, 2020).
- Suita conjecture (Qi'an Guan and Xiangyu Zhou, 2015).
- Disproof of the Connes embedding problem (Zhengfeng Ji, Anand Natarajan, Thomas Vidick, John Wright, and Henry Yuen, 2020), as a consequence of their proof that $\mathrm{MIP}^*=\mathrm{RE}$.

==== Group theory ====
- Existence of a non-sofic, discrete, countable group (solution in an anonymized paper published by OpenAI, 2026).
- Umbral moonshine conjecture (John F. R. Duncan, Michael J. Griffin, Ken Ono, 2015).

=== Analysis ===
- Sendov's conjecture and Phelps–Rodriguez conjecture (Lech Mazur using GPT-5.6 Pro, 2026).
- Crouzeix's conjecture (Shanmu Jin using GPT-5.6 Sol, 2026. Subsequent independent proof by Emiel Lorist and Felix Schwenninger using GPT-5.6 Sol, 2026).
- Heil–Ramanathan–Topiwala conjecture (Markus Faulhuber, Philipp Petersen, Jordy Timo van Velthoven, Felix Voigtlaender using GPT-5.6 Pro, 2026).
- Mizohata–Takeuchi conjecture (Hannah Cairo, 2025).

=== Combinatorics ===
- Erdős unit distance conjecture (published in an anonymized paper by OpenAI, 2026).
- Bunkbed conjecture (Nikita Gladkov, Igor Pak, Alexander Zimin, 2025).
- Erdős sumset conjecture (Joel Moreira, Florian Richter, Donald Robertson, 2018).
- McMullen's g-conjecture on the possible numbers of faces of different dimensions in a simplicial sphere (also Grünbaum conjecture, several conjectures of Kühnel). (Karim Adiprasito, 2018).
- Upper bound for the cap set problem (Jordan Ellenberg, Dion Gijswijt, 2016).
- Erdős discrepancy problem (Terence Tao, 2015)

=== Dynamical systems ===
- Eremenko's conjecture: every component of the escaping set of an entire transcendental function is unbounded. (David Martí-Pete, Lasse Rempe, and James Waterman, 2025).
- Zimmer's conjecture (Aaron Brown, David Fisher, and Sebastián Hurtado-Salazar, 2017).

=== Game theory ===
- Existence of a non-terminating game of beggar-my-neighbour (Brayden Casella, 2024).

=== Geometry ===
- Existence of a complex structure on $S^6$ (Levent Alpöge, 2026 using Claude Fable 5).
- Talagrand's convexity conjecture (Dongming Hua, Antoine Song, Stefan Tudose using GPT-5.5 Pro, 2026).
- Carathéodory conjecture for surfaces of smoothness $C^{4}$ (Brendan Guilfoyle and Wilhelm Klingenberg, 2025).
- Einstein problem (David Smith, Joseph Samuel Myers, Craig S. Kaplan, Chaim Goodman-Strauss, 2024).
- Egan conjecture (Sergei Drozdov, 2023).
- Keller's conjecture (Joshua Brakensiek, Marijn Heule, John Mackey, David Narvaez, 2019).
- Maximal rank conjecture (Eric Larson, 2018).
- Weibel's conjecture (Moritz Kerz, Florian Strunk, and Georg Tamme, 2018).
- Yau's conjecture (Antoine Song, 2018).
- Pentagonal tiling (Michaël Rao, 2017).

=== Graph theory ===
- Disproof of Jaeger's Petersen-coloring conjecture: every bridgeless cubic graph has a cycle-continuous mapping to the Petersen graph (NeuralReformist (July 2026); Jan Goedgebeur, Jorik Jooken, Edita Máčajová, Davide Mattiolo, Giuseppe Mazzuoccolo, and Nikolay Ulyanov, August 2026).
- Dinitz–Garg–Goemans conjecture (Dmitry Rybin using GPT-5.6 Pro, 2026).
- Kahn–Kalai conjecture (Jinyoung Park and Huy Tuan Pham, 2022).
- Blankenship–Oporowski conjecture on the book thickness of subdivisions (Vida Dujmović, David Eppstein, Robert Hickingbotham, Pat Morin, and David Wood, 2021).
- Ringel's conjecture that the complete graph $K_{2n+1}$ can be decomposed into $2n+1$ copies of any tree with $n$ edges (Richard Montgomery, Benny Sudakov, Alexey Pokrovskiy, 2020).
- Disproof of Hedetniemi's conjecture on the chromatic number of tensor products of graphs (Yaroslav Shitov, 2019).
- Kelmans–Seymour conjecture (Dawei He, Yan Wang, and Xingxing Yu, 2020).
- Goldberg–Seymour conjecture (Guantao Chen, Guangming Jing, and Wenan Zang, 2019).
- Babai's problem (Alireza Abdollahi, Maysam Zallaghi, 2015).

=== Number theory ===
- André–Oort conjecture (Jonathan Pila, Ananth Shankar, Jacob Tsimerman, 2021).
- Duffin–Schaeffer theorem (Dimitris Koukoulopoulos, James Maynard, 2019).
- Main conjecture in Vinogradov's mean-value theorem (Jean Bourgain, Ciprian Demeter, Larry Guth, 2015).

=== Ramsey theory ===
- Burr–Erdős conjecture (Choongbum Lee, 2017).
- Boolean Pythagorean triples problem (Marijn Heule, Oliver Kullmann, Victor W. Marek, 2016).

=== Theoretical computer science ===
- Sensitivity conjecture for Boolean functions (Hao Huang, 2019).

=== Topology ===
- Deciding whether the Conway knot is a slice knot (Lisa Piccirillo, 2020).

== See also ==
- List of conjectures
- List of unsolved problems in statistics
- List of unsolved problems in computer science
- List of unsolved problems in physics
- List of problems in loop theory and quasigroup theory
- Lists of unsolved problems
- Open Problems in Mathematics
- Scottish Book
- The Great Mathematical Problems
