= Babai's problem =

Unsolved problem in mathematics:
Which finite groups are BI-groups?
(more unsolved problems in mathematics)

Babai's problem is a problem in algebraic graph theory first proposed in 1979 by László Babai.

== Babai's problem ==
Let $G$ be a finite group, let $\operatorname{Irr}(G)$ be the set of all irreducible characters of $G$, let $\Gamma=\operatorname{Cay}(G,S)$ be the Cayley graph (or directed Cayley graph) corresponding to a generating subset $S$ of $G\setminus \{1\}$, and let $\nu$ be a positive integer. Is the set

$$M_\nu^S=\left\{\sum_{s\in S} \chi(s)\;|\; \chi\in \operatorname{Irr}(G),\; \chi(1)=\nu \right\}$$

an invariant of the graph $\Gamma$? In other words, does $\operatorname{Cay}(G,S)\cong \operatorname{Cay}(G,S')$ imply that $M_\nu^S=M_\nu^{S'}$?

== BI-group ==
A finite group $G$ is called a BI-group (Babai Invariant group) if $\operatorname{Cay}(G,S)\cong \operatorname{Cay}(G,T)$ for some inverse closed subsets $S$ and $T$ of $G\setminus \{1\}$ implies that $M_\nu^S=M_\nu^T$ for all positive integers $\nu$.

== Open problem ==
Which finite groups are BI-groups?

== See also ==
- List of unsolved problems in mathematics
- List of problems solved since 1995
