= Z number =

Z number may refer to:

- Z-number, the subject of Mahler's 3/2 problem
- a composition designator in Zimmerman's list of compositions by Henry Purcell
- Z score
- the atomic number of an element, informally sometimes called a Z number after the conventional symbol, Z
