= Brieskorn–Grothendieck resolution =

In mathematics, a Brieskorn–Grothendieck resolution is a resolution conjectured by Alexander Grothendieck, that in particular gives a resolution of the universal deformation of a Kleinian singularity. Egbert Brieskorn (1971) announced the construction of this resolution, and Peter Slodowy (1980) published the details of Brieskorn's construction.
