= Isomorphism problem =

Isomorphism problem may refer to:

- graph isomorphism problem
- group isomorphism problem
  - isomorphism problem of Coxeter groups
