= Nakai =

Nakai may refer to:

== People ==
- Nakai (surname)
- In botany, an abbreviation for author Takenoshin Nakai

== Places ==
- Nakai, Kanagawa, Japan
- Nakai District, Laos
- Nakai Misl, former principality of the Punjab Region

== Others ==
- Nakai (Japanese vocation)
- Nakai, a captive orca
- Nakai, a Lizardman in the Warhammer game
- Nakai, a race in the Stargate Universe
- Nakai language, an Ok language of Indonesia
