= Egbert Brieskorn =

German mathematician (1936–2013)

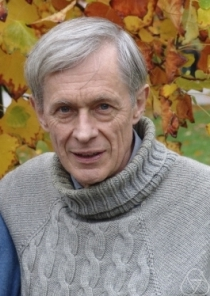
Egbert Brieskorn

Egbert Valentin Brieskorn (7 July 1936 in Rostock – 11 July 2013 in Bonn) was a German mathematician who introduced Brieskorn spheres and the Brieskorn–Grothendieck resolution.

== Education ==
Brieskorn was born in 1936 as the son of a mill construction engineer in East Prussia. He grew up in Freudenberg (Siegerland) and studied mathematics and physics at the Ludwig-Maximilians-Universität München and the Rheinische Friedrich-Wilhelms-Universität Bonn. In 1963 he received his doctorate at Bonn under Friedrich Hirzebruch with thesis Zur differentialtopologischen und analytischen Klassifizierung gewisser algebraischer Mannigfaltigkeiten, followed by his habilitation in 1968.

== Career ==
From 1969 until 1973 he was professor ordinarius at Georg-August-Universität Göttingen and from 1973 to 1975 at the Sonderforschungsbereich Theoretische Mathematik in Bonn (since 1980 called the Max-Planck-Institut für Mathematik). From 1975 until his retirement as professor emeritus in 2001 he was a professor ordinarius at Bonn. He held temporary academic positions at the Massachusetts Institute of Technology (MIT) (where in 1965 he was Moore Instructor), the Institut des Hautes Études Scientifiques (IHES), the Eidgenössische Technische Hochschule Zürich (ETH Zürich), the University of Leiden, the University of Oxford, the University of Warwick, the University of Liverpool, and the University of Nice.

== Contributions ==
Brieskorn was one of the editors of the collected works of Felix Hausdorff. In 1970 he was an invited speaker at the International Congress of Mathematicians in Nice (Singular elements of semi-simple algebraic groups). His doctoral students include Horst Knörrer, Peter Slodowy, Kyoji Saito, and Erhard Scholz.
