= Holyhedron =

Type of 3-dimensional geometric body

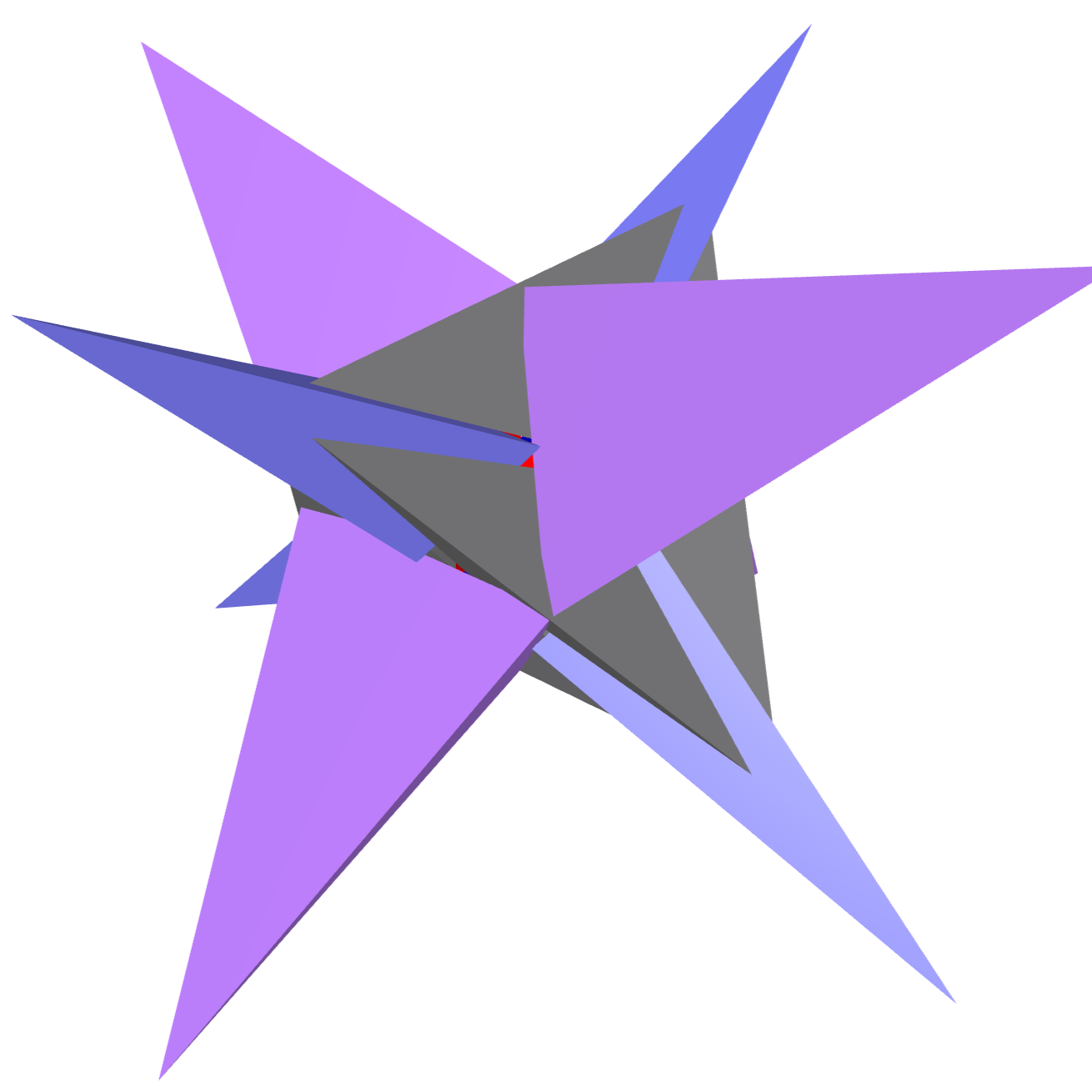
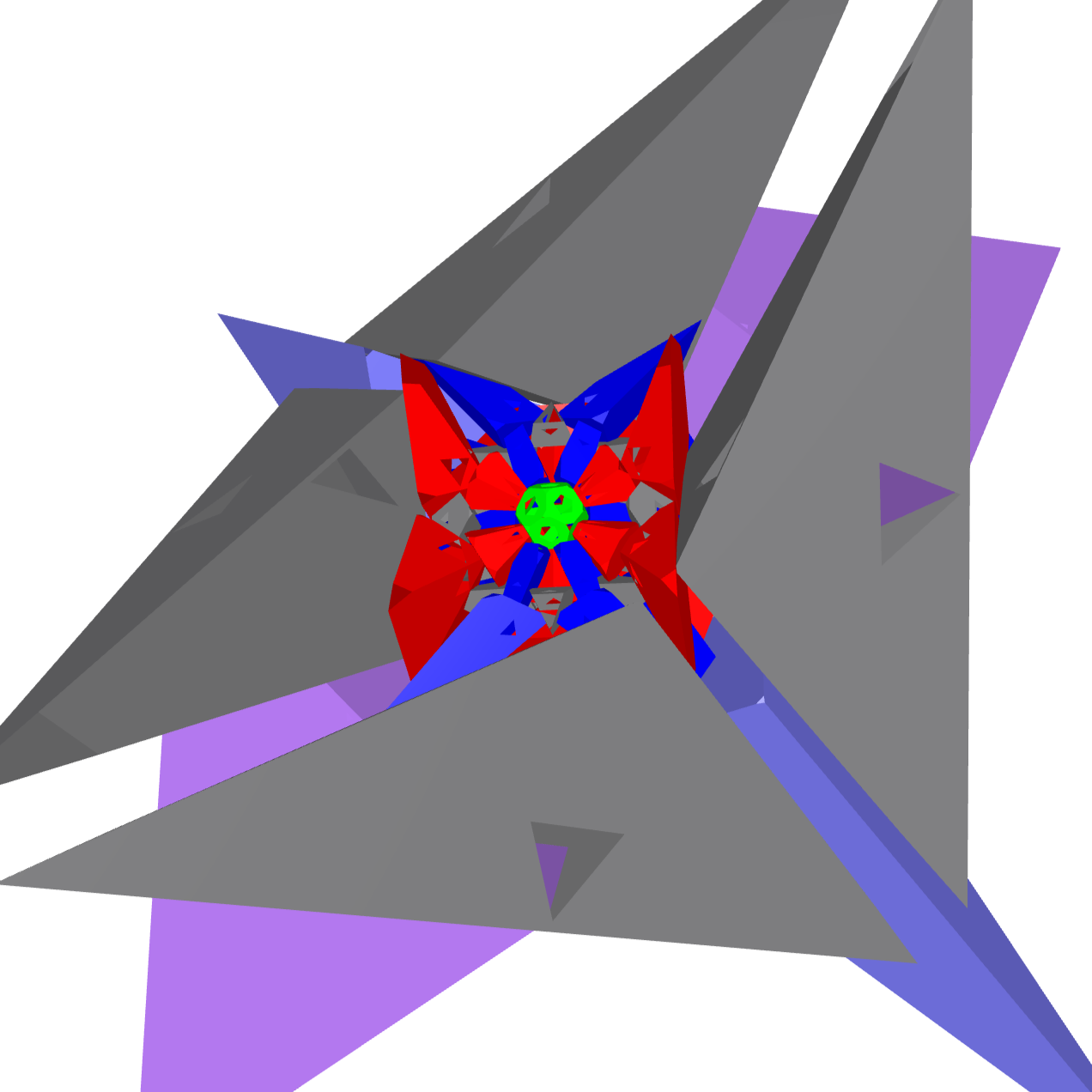
492 face Holyhedron for outer view, and with some pieces removed for inner view
Unsolved problem in mathematics
What is the lowest number of faces possible for a holyhedron?
More unsolved problems in mathematics

In mathematics, a holyhedron is a type of 3-dimensional geometric body: a polyhedron each of whose faces contains at least one polygon-shaped hole, and whose holes' boundaries share no point with each other or the face's boundary.

== History ==
The concept was first introduced by John H. Conway; the term "holyhedron" was coined by David W. Wilson in 1997 as a pun involving polyhedra and holes. Conway also offered a prize of 10,000 USD, divided by the number of faces, for finding an example, asking:

Is there a polyhedron in Euclidean three-dimensional space that has only finitely many plane faces, each of which is a closed connected subset of the appropriate plane whose relative interior in that plane is multiply connected?

No actual holyhedron was constructed until 1999, when Jade P. Vinson presented an example of a holyhedron with a total of 78,585,627 faces. Another example was subsequently given by Don Hatch, who presented a holyhedron with 492 faces in 2003, worth about 20.33 USD prize money. A new construction was obtained by Geby Jaff using Archivara in 2026, containing 476 faces.
