= Fujita conjecture =

In mathematics, Fujita's conjecture is a problem in the theories of algebraic geometry and complex manifolds. It is named after Takao Fujita, who formulated it in 1985.

== Statement ==
In complex geometry, the conjecture states that for a positive holomorphic line bundle $L$ on a compact complex manifold $M$, the line bundle $K_M \otimes L^{\otimes m}$ (where $K_M$ is a canonical line bundle of $M$) is

- spanned by sections when $m\geq n+1$;
- very ample when $m\geq n+2$,

where $n$ is the complex dimension of $M$.

Note that for large $m$ the line bundle $K_M \otimes L^{\otimes m}$ is very ample by the standard Serre's vanishing theorem (and its complex analytic variant). The Fujita conjecture provides an explicit bound on $m$, which is optimal for projective spaces.

== Known cases ==
For surfaces the Fujita conjecture follows from Reider's theorem. For three-dimensional algebraic varieties, Ein and Lazarsfeld in 1993 proved the first part of the Fujita conjecture, i.e. that $m\geq 4$ implies global generation.

== See also ==
- Ohsawa–Takegoshi L^{2} extension theorem
