= Overfull graph =

This graph is overfull because its size is larger than the product of its maximum degree and the number of vertices in the graph (its order) divided by 2 and rounded down. In this case, 22 $>$ 20.

Unsolved problem in mathematics
Conjecture: A graph G with $\Delta (G) > n/3$ is class 2 if and only if it has an overfull subgraph S such that $\displaystyle \Delta (G) = \Delta (S)$.
More unsolved problems in mathematics

In graph theory, an overfull graph is a graph whose size is greater than the product of its maximum degree and half of its order floored, i.e. $|E| > \Delta (G) \lfloor |V|/2 \rfloor$ where $|E|$ is the size of G, $\displaystyle\Delta(G)$ is the maximum degree of G, and $|V|$ is the order of G. The concept of an overfull subgraph, an overfull graph that is a subgraph, immediately follows. An alternate, stricter definition of an overfull subgraph S of a graph G requires $\displaystyle\Delta (G) = \Delta (S)$.

== Examples ==
Every odd cycle graph of length three or more is overfull. The product of its degree (two) and half its length (rounded down) is one less than the number of edges in the cycle. More generally, every regular graph with an odd number $n$ of vertices is overfull, because its number of edges, $\Delta n/2$ (where $\Delta$ is its degree), is larger than $\Delta\lfloor n/2\rfloor$.

== Properties ==
A few properties of overfull graphs:

1. Overfull graphs are of odd order.
2. Overfull graphs are class 2. That is, they require at least Δ + 1 colors in any edge coloring.
3. A graph G, with an overfull subgraph S such that $\displaystyle\Delta (G) = \Delta (S)$, is of class 2.

== Overfull conjecture ==
In 1986, Amanda Chetwynd and Anthony Hilton posited the following conjecture that is now known as the overfull conjecture.

A graph G with $\Delta (G) > n/3$ is class 2 if and only if it has an overfull subgraph S such that $\displaystyle \Delta (G) = \Delta (S)$.

This conjecture, if true, would have numerous implications in graph theory, including the 1-factorization conjecture.

== Algorithms ==
For graphs in which $\Delta \ge n/3$, there are at most three induced overfull subgraphs, and it is possible to find an overfull subgraph in polynomial time. When $\Delta \ge n/2$, there is at most one induced overfull subgraph, and it is possible to find it in linear time.
