= Reider's theorem =

In algebraic geometry, Reider's theorem gives conditions for a line bundle on a projective surface to be very ample.

== Statement ==
Let D be a nef divisor on a smooth projective surface X. Denote by K_{X} the canonical divisor of X.

- If D^{2} > 4, then the linear system |K_{X}+D| has no base points unless there exists a nonzero effective divisor E such that
  - $DE = 0, E^2 = -1$, or
  - $DE = 1, E^2 =0$;
- If D^{2} > 8, then the linear system |K_{X}+D| is very ample unless there exists a nonzero effective divisor E satisfying one of the following:
  - $DE = 0, E^2 = -1$ or $-2$;
  - $DE = 1, E^2 = 0$ or $-1$;
  - $DE = 2, E^2 = 0$;
  - $DE = 3, D = 3E, E^2 = 1$

== Applications ==
Reider's theorem implies the surface case of the Fujita conjecture. Let L be an ample line bundle on a smooth projective surface X. If m > 2, then for D=mL we have

- D^{2} = m^{2} L^{2} ≥ m^{2} > 4;
- for any effective divisor E the ampleness of L implies D · E = m(L · E) ≥ m > 2.

Thus by the first part of Reider's theorem |K_{X}+mL| is base-point-free. Similarly, for any m > 3 the linear system |K_{X}+mL| is very ample.
