= Euclid number =

Product of prime numbers, plus one

In mathematics, Euclid numbers are integers of the form E_{n} = p_{n}# + 1, where p_{n}# is the nth primorial (the product of the first n prime numbers). They are named after the ancient Greek mathematician Euclid, in connection with Euclid's theorem that there are infinitely many prime numbers.

A Euclid number of the second kind (also called Kummer number) is an integer of the form E_{n} = p_{n}# − 1, where p_{n}# is the nth primorial.

== Examples ==
For example, the first three primes are 2, 3, 5; their product is 30, and the corresponding Euclid number is 31.

The first few Euclid numbers are 3, 7, 31, 211, 2311, 30031, 510511, 9699691, 223092871, 6469693231, 200560490131, ... (sequence A006862 in the OEIS).

The first few Kummer numbers are 1, 5, 29, 209, 2309, 30029, 510509, 9699689, 223092869, 6469693229, 200560490129, ... (sequence A057588 in the OEIS).

== History ==
It is sometimes falsely stated that Euclid's celebrated proof of the infinitude of prime numbers relied on these numbers. Euclid did not begin with the assumption that the set of all primes is finite. Rather, he said: consider any finite set of primes (he did not assume that it contained only the first n primes) and reasoned from there to the conclusion that at least one prime exists that is not in that set. Nevertheless, Euclid's argument, applied to the set of the first n primes, shows that the nth Euclid number has a prime factor that is not in this set.

== Properties ==
Not all Euclid or Kummer numbers are prime. E_{6} = 13# + 1 = 30031 = 59 × 509 is the first composite Euclid number, and E_{4} = 7# − 1 = 209 = 11 × 19 is the first composite Kummer number.

For all n ≥ 3 the last digit of E_{n} is 1, since E_{n} − 1 is divisible by 2 and 5. In other words, since all primorial numbers greater than E_{2} have 2 and 5 as prime factors, they are divisible by 10, thus all E_{n ≥ 3} + 1 have a final digit of 1. Likewise, the last digit of every Kummer number is 9.

No Euclid or Kummer numbers are perfect powers.

== Unsolved problems ==
Unsolved problem in mathematics
Are there an infinite number of prime Euclid numbers?
More unsolved problems in mathematics
Unsolved problem in mathematics
Are there an infinite number of prime Kummer numbers?
More unsolved problems in mathematics

It is not known whether there is an infinite number of prime Euclid numbers (primorial primes) or prime Kummer numbers. It is also unknown whether every Euclid number is a squarefree number.

Unsolved problem in mathematics
Is every Euclid number squarefree?
More unsolved problems in mathematics

== See also ==
- Euclid–Mullin sequence
- Proof of the infinitude of the primes (Euclid's theorem)
