= Nakai (surname) =

Nakai (written: 中井, 中居 or 仲井) is a Japanese surname. Notable people with the surname include:

- Ami Nakai (中井 亜美; 2008), Japanese figure skater
- Asakazu Nakai (中井 朝一; 1901–1988), Japanese cinematographer
- Daisuke Nakai (中井 大介; born 1989), Japanese professional baseball infielder
- Hiroe Nakai (中井 広恵; born 1969), Japanese shogi player
- Hiroshi Nakai (中井 洽; 1942–2017), Japanese politician
- Hiroshi Nakai (中井 弘; 1839–1894), Japanese politician
- Kazuya Nakai (中井 和哉; born 1967), Japanese voice actor
- Kie Nakai (中井 貴惠; born 1957), Japanese actress
- Kiichi Nakai (中井 貴一; born 1961), Japanese actor
- Masahiro Nakai (中居 正広; born 1972), Japanese singer, actor and host
- Masakazu Nakai (中井 正一; 1900–1952), Japanese aesthetician, film theorist, librarian, and social activist
- Masutaro Nakai (中井 増太郎; 1895–1969), general in the Imperial Japanese Army
- Nakai Chikuzan (中井 竹山; 1730–1804), Japanese politician
- Noémie Nakai (中井 ノエミ; born 1990), Japanese actress, director
- Norio Nakai (中井 紀夫; born 1952), Japanese writer
- Takahiro Nakai (中井 貴裕; born 1990), Japanese judoka
- Takuhiro Nakai (中井 卓大; born 2003), Japanese footballer, known as Pipi
- Takenoshin Nakai (中井 猛之進; 1882–1952), Japanese botanist
- Takezo Nakai (中井 武三; born 1949), Japanese former handball player
- Yasuyuki Nakai (中井 康之; 1954–2014), Japanese baseball player
- Yoshikazu Nakai (中井 喜和; 1920–1991), Japanese mathematician, originator of the Nakai conjecture
- Yoshiki Nakai (中井 義樹; born 1983), Japanese football player
- Yoshinori Nakai (中井 義則; born 1960), Japanese artist
- Yuki Nakai (中井 祐樹; born 1970), retired Japanese shooto practitioner and mixed martial artist
- Yukino Nakai (仲井 由希乃; born 1996), Japanese badminton player

Nakai is also a surname among the Navajo people of the American Southwest. Notable people with the surname include:

- R. Carlos Nakai (born 1946), Native American flautist
- Raymond Nakai (1918–2005), Chairman of the Navajo Nation (1963–1970)
