= Peter Slodowy =

German mathematician

Peter Slodowy

Peter Slodowy (12 October 1948, in Leverkusen – 19 November 2002, in Bonn) was a German mathematician who worked on singularity theory and algebraic geometry.

He completed his Ph.D. thesis at the University of Regensburg in 1978 under the direction of Theodor Bröcker and Egbert Brieskorn. The Slodowy correspondence is named after him.

== Publications ==
- Slodowy, Peter (1980), Simple Singularities and Simple Algebraic Groups, Lecture Notes in Mathematics, vol. 815, Berlin, New York: Springer-Verlag, doi:10.1007/BFb0090294, ISBN 978-3-540-10026-3, MR 0584445
