= The Great Mathematical Problems =

Book by Ian Stewart

- Softcover edition
- Author: Ian Stewart
- Language: English
- Subject: Mathematics
- Genre: Non-fiction
- Publisher: Profile Books
- Publication date: March 1, 2013
- Media type: Print, e-book
- Pages: 320 pp.
- ISBN: 1846681995

The Great Mathematical Problems (Note: Also known as Visions of Infinity: The Great Mathematical Problems, Visions of Infinity or The Great Mathematical Problems: Marvels and Mysteries of Mathematics.) is a 2013 book by Ian Stewart. It discusses fourteen mathematical problems and is written for laypersons. The book has received positive reviews.

== Content ==
Stewart describes important open or recently closed problems in mathematics:

- Goldbach's conjecture
- Squaring the circle
- Four colour theorem
- Kepler's conjecture
- Mordell's conjecture
- Fermat's Last Theorem
- Three-body problem
- Riemann hypothesis
- Poincare conjecture
- P versus NP problem
- Navier–Stokes equation
- Mass gap
- Birch and Swinnerton-Dyer conjecture
- Hodge conjecture

== Reception ==
Ian Stewart belongs to a very small, very exclusive club of popular science and mathematics writers who are worth reading today.

— Robert Schaefer of New York Journal of Books

Kirkus Reviews said Stewart "succeed[ed] in illuminating many but not all of some very difficult ideas", and that the book "will enchant math enthusiasts as well as general readers who pay close attention". Robert Schaefer from the New York Journal of Books described "The Great Mathematical Problems" as "both entertaining and accessible", although later noted that "in the end chapters ... explanations of the conjectures get more complicated".

Fred Bortz gave the book a positive review in The Dallas Morning News, commenting "few authors are better at understanding their readers than the prolific mathematics writer Ian Stewart" and saying that "anyone who has always loved math for its own sake or for the way it provides new perspectives on important real-world phenomena will find hours of brain-teasing and mind-challenging delight in the British professor’s survey of recently answered or still open mathematical questions".
