= Du Val singularity =

Mathematical concept describing isolated singularity of an algebraic surface

In algebraic geometry, a Du Val singularity, also called simple surface singularity, Kleinian singularity, or rational double point, is an isolated singularity of a complex surface which is modeled on a double branched cover of the plane, with minimal resolution obtained by replacing the singular point with a tree of smooth rational curves, with intersection pattern dual to a Dynkin diagram of A-D-E singularity type. They are the canonical singularities (or, equivalently, rational Gorenstein singularities) in dimension 2. They were studied by Patrick du Val and Felix Klein.

The Du Val singularities also appear as quotients of $\Complex^2$ by a finite subgroup of SL_{2}$(\Complex)$; equivalently, a finite subgroup of SU(2), which are known as binary polyhedral groups. The rings of invariant polynomials of these finite group actions were computed by Klein, and are essentially the coordinate rings of the singularities; this is a classic result in invariant theory.

== Classification ==
Du Val singularies are classified by the simply laced Dynkin diagrams, a form of ADE classification.

The possible Du Val singularities are (up to analytical isomorphism):

- $A_n: \quad w^2+x^2+y^{n+1}=0$
- $D_n: \quad w^2+y(x^2+y^{n-2}) = 0 \qquad (n\ge 4)$
- $E_6: \quad w^2+x^3+y^4=0$
- $E_7: \quad w^2+x(x^2+y^3)=0$
- $E_8: \quad w^2+x^3+y^5=0.$

== See also ==
- Brieskorn–Grothendieck resolution
- General elephant conjecture
