= Ohsawa–Takegoshi L2 extension theorem =

Result concerning the holomorphic extensions In several complex variables

In several complex variables, the Ohsawa–Takegoshi L^{2} extension theorem is a fundamental result concerning the holomorphic extension of an $L^2$-holomorphic function defined on a bounded Stein manifold (such as a pseudoconvex compact set in $\mathbb{C}^n$ of dimension less than $n$) to a domain of higher dimension, with a bound on the growth. It was discovered by Takeo Ohsawa and Kensho Takegoshi in 1987, using what have been described as ad hoc methods involving twisted Laplace–Beltrami operators, but simpler proofs have since been discovered. One of the deepest result in complex analysis. Many generalizations and similar results exist, and are known as theorems of Ohsawa–Takegoshi type.

== See also ==
- Suita conjecture
