= Spherical Bernstein's problem =

The spherical Bernstein's problem is a possible generalization of the original Bernstein's problem in the field of global differential geometry, first proposed by Shiing-Shen Chern in 1969, and then later in 1970, during his plenary address at the International Congress of Mathematicians in Nice.

== The problem ==
Are the equators in $\mathbb{S}^{n+1}$ the only smooth embedded minimal hypersurfaces which are topological $n$-dimensional spheres?

Additionally, the spherical Bernstein's problem, while itself a generalization of the original Bernstein's problem, can also be generalized further by replacing the ambient space $\mathbb{S}^{n+1}$ with a simply connected, compact symmetric space. Some results in this direction are due to Wu-Yi Hsiang, Wu-Teh Hsiang, and P. Tomter.

== Alternative formulations ==
Below are two alternative ways to express the problem:

=== The second formulation ===
Let the (n − 1) sphere be embedded as a minimal hypersurface in $S^n$(1). Is it necessarily an equator?

By the Almgren–Calabi theorem, it's true when n = 3 (or n = 2 for the 1st formulation).

Wu-Yi Hsiang proved it for n ∈ {4, 5, 6, 7, 8, 10, 12, 14} (or n ∈ {3, 4, 5, 6, 7, 9, 11, 13}, respectively)

In 1987, Per Tomter proved it for all even n (or all odd n, respectively).

Thus, it only remains unknown for all odd n ≥ 9 (or all even n ≥ 8, respectively)

=== The third formulation ===
Is it true that an embedded, minimal hypersphere inside the Euclidean $n$-sphere is necessarily an equator?

Geometrically, the problem is analogous to the following problem:

Is the local topology at an isolated singular point of a minimal hypersurface necessarily different from that of a disc?

For example, the affirmative answer for spherical Bernstein problem when n = 3 is equivalent to the fact that the local topology at an isolated singular point of any minimal hypersurface in an arbitrary Riemannian 4-manifold must be different from that of a disc.
