= General elephant =

In algebraic geometry, general elephant is an idiosyncratic name for a general element of the anticanonical system of a variety, introduced by Miles Reid. For 3-folds the general elephant problem (or conjecture) asks whether general elephants have at most du Val singularities; this has been proved in several cases.
