= Contact type =

Symplectic manifold hypersurface

In mathematics, more precisely in symplectic geometry, a hypersurface $\Sigma$ of a symplectic manifold $(M,\omega)$ is said to be of contact type if there is 1-form $\alpha$ such that $j^{*}(\omega)=d\alpha$ and $(\Sigma,\alpha)$ is a contact manifold, where $j: \Sigma \to M$ is the natural inclusion. The terminology was coined by Alan Weinstein.

== See also ==
- Weinstein conjecture
