= Suita conjecture =

In mathematics, the Suita conjecture is a conjecture related to the theory of the Riemann surface, the boundary behavior of conformal maps, the theory of Bergman kernel, and the theory of the L^{2} extension. The conjecture states the following:

Suita (1972): Let R be an Riemann surface, which admits a nontrivial Green function $G_R$. Let $\omega$ be a local coordinate on a neighborhood $V_{z_0}$ of $z_0 \in R$ satisfying $w(z_0) = 0$. Let $\kappa R$ be the Bergman kernel for holomorphic (1, 0) forms on R. We define $B_{R}(z)|dw|^2 := \kappa_{R}(z)|_{V_{z_0}}$, and $B_{R}(z, \overline{t})d\omega \otimes d\overline{t} := \kappa_{R}(z,\overline{t})$ . Let $c_{\beta}(z)$ be the logarithmic capacity which is locally defined by $c_{\beta}(z_0) := \exp \lim_{\xi \to z} (G_{R}(z, z_{0}) -\log |\omega(z)|)$ on R. Then, the inequality $(c_{\beta}(z_{0}))^2 \leq \pi B_{R}(z_0)$ holds on the every open Riemann surface R, and also, with equality, then $B_{R} \equiv 0$ or, R is conformally equivalent to the unit disc less a (possible) closed set of inner capacity zero.

It was first proved by Błocki (2013) for the bounded plane domain and then completely in a more generalized version by Guan & Zhou (2015). Also, another proof of the Suita conjecture and some examples of its generalization to several complex variables (the multi (high) - dimensional Suita conjecture) were given in Błocki (2014a) and Błocki & Zwonek (2020). The multi (high) - dimensional Suita conjecture fails in non-pseudoconvex domains. This conjecture was proved through the optimal estimation of the Ohsawa–Takegoshi L^{2} extension theorem.
