= Isomorphism problem of Coxeter groups =

Unsolved problem in mathematics
Given two Coxeter groups $\Gamma_1$ and $\Gamma_2$, decide whether $W(\Gamma_1)\simeq{W(\Gamma_2)}$.
More unsolved problems in mathematics

It is an unresolved problem in the mathematical field of group theory to determine whether or not two Coxeter groups (specified by their Coxeter diagrams) are isomorphic as abstract groups. Equivalently, the problem asks to determine, for a given Coxeter group $W$, the possible subsets $S$ of $W$ that are Coxeter generating sets for $W$ (that is, for which $(W , S)$ is a Coxeter system).

A slight generalization of the problem can be made by asking to find to all isomorphisms from one group onto the other. In 2022, Yuri Santos Rego and Petra Schwer introduced a new framework to deal with the problem (a finite dimensional, locally finite, ranked simplicial complex to capture isomorphisms between finite rank Coxeter systems) and asked more related open questions motivated by it.
