= Fröberg conjecture =

In algebraic geometry, the Fröberg conjecture is a conjecture about the possible Hilbert functions of a set of forms. It is named after Ralf Fröberg, who introduced it in Fröberg (1985, page 120). The Fröberg–Iarrobino conjecture is a generalization introduced by Anthony Iarrobino (1997).

== Statement of Conjecture ==
Given generic homogeneous polynomials $g_1,g_2,\ldots,g_k\in \mathbb{C}[x_1,x_2,\ldots,x_n]$ of degrees $a_1,a_2,\ldots, a_k$, respectively. Then the Hilbert series of $\mathbb{C}[x_1,x_2,\ldots,x_n]/\langle g_1,g_2,\ldots, g_k\rangle$ is

$${(1+t+t^2+\cdots)^n}{(1-t^{a_1})(1-t^{a_2})\cdots (1-t^{a_k})},$$

truncated at its first negative term.
