= Lovász conjecture =

Problem in graph theory

Unsolved problem in mathematics:
Does every finite connected vertex-transitive graph contain a Hamiltonian path?
(more unsolved problems in mathematics)

In graph theory, the Lovász conjecture (1969) is a classical problem on Hamiltonian paths in graphs. It says:

Every finite connected vertex-transitive graph contains a Hamiltonian path.

Originally László Lovász stated the problem in the opposite way, but this version became standard. In 1996, László Babai published a conjecture sharply contradicting this conjecture, but both conjectures remain widely open. It is not even known if a single counterexample would necessarily lead to a series of counterexamples.

== Historical remarks ==
The problem of finding Hamiltonian paths in highly symmetric graphs is quite old. As Donald Knuth describes it in volume 4 of The Art of Computer Programming, the problem originated in British campanology (bell-ringing). Such Hamiltonian paths and cycles are also closely connected to Gray codes. In each case the constructions are explicit.

== Variants of the Lovász conjecture ==
=== Hamiltonian cycle ===
Another version of Lovász conjecture states that

Every finite connected vertex-transitive graph contains a Hamiltonian cycle except the five known counterexamples.

There are 5 known examples of vertex-transitive graphs with no Hamiltonian cycles (but with Hamiltonian paths): the complete graph $K_2$, the Petersen graph, the Coxeter graph and two graphs derived from the Petersen and Coxeter graphs by replacing each vertex with a triangle.

=== Cayley graphs ===
None of the 5 vertex-transitive graphs with no Hamiltonian cycles is a Cayley graph. This observation leads to a weaker version of the conjecture:

Every finite connected Cayley graph contains a Hamiltonian cycle.

The advantage of the Cayley graph formulation is that such graphs correspond to a finite group $G$ and a generating set $S$. Thus one can ask for which $G$ and $S$ the conjecture holds rather than attack it in full generality.

=== Directed Cayley graph ===
For directed Cayley graphs (digraphs) the Lovász conjecture is false. Various counterexamples were obtained by Robert Alexander Rankin. Still, many of the below results hold in this restrictive setting.

== Special cases ==
A Hamiltonian path in the permutohedron, a Cayley graph of the symmetric group with Coxeter generators

Every directed Cayley graph of an abelian group has a Hamiltonian path; however, every cyclic group whose order is not a prime power has a directed Cayley graph that does not have a Hamiltonian cycle. In 1986, D. Witte proved that the Lovász conjecture holds for the Cayley graphs of p-groups. It is open even for dihedral groups, although for special sets of generators some progress has been made.

For the symmetric group $S_n$, there are many attractive generating sets. For example, the Lovász conjecture holds in the following cases of generating sets:

- $a = (1,2,\dots,n), b = (1,2)$ (long cycle and a transposition).
- $s_1 = (1,2), s_2 = (2,3), \dots, s_{n-1} = (n-1,n)$ (Coxeter generators). In this case a Hamiltonian cycle is generated by the Steinhaus–Johnson–Trotter algorithm.
- any set of transpositions corresponding to a labelled tree on $\{1,2,..,n\}$.
- $a =(1,2), b = (1,2)(3,4)\cdots, c = (2,3)(4,5)\cdots$

Stong has shown that the conjecture holds for the Cayley graph of the wreath product Z_{m} wr Z_{n} with the natural minimal generating set when m is either even or three. In particular this holds for the cube-connected cycles, which can be generated as the Cayley graph of the wreath product Z_{2} wr Z_{n}.

== General groups ==
For general finite groups, only a few results are known:

- $S=\{a,b\}, (ab)^2=1$ (Rankin generators)
- $S=\{a,b,c\}, a^2= b^2=c^2=[a,b]=1$ (Rapaport–Strasser generators)
- $S=\{a,b,c\}, a^2=1, c = a^{-1}ba$ (Pak–Radoičić generators)
- $S=\{a,b\}, a^2 = b^s =(ab)^3 = 1,$ where $|G|,s = 2~mod ~4$ (here we have (2,s,3)-presentation, Glover–Marušič theorem).

Finally, it is known that for every finite group $G$ there exists a generating set of size at most $\log_2 |G|$ such that the corresponding Cayley graph is Hamiltonian (Pak-Radoičić). This result is based on classification of finite simple groups.

The Lovász conjecture was also established for random generating sets of size $\Omega(\log^5 |G|)$.
