= Nakai conjecture =

Conjecture in algebraic geometry

In mathematics, the Nakai conjecture is an unproven characterization of smooth algebraic varieties, conjectured by Japanese mathematician Yoshikazu Nakai in 1961. It states that if V is a complex algebraic variety, such that its ring of differential operators is generated by the derivations it contains, then V is a smooth variety. The converse statement, that smooth algebraic varieties have rings of differential operators that are generated by their derivations, is a result of Alexander Grothendieck.

The Nakai conjecture is known to be true for algebraic curves and Stanley–Reisner rings. A proof of the conjecture would also establish the Zariski–Lipman conjecture, for a complex variety V with coordinate ring R. This conjecture states that if the derivations of R are a free module over R, then V is smooth.
