= Mahler's 3/2 problem =

In mathematics, Mahler's 3/2 problem concerns the existence of "Z-numbers".

A Z-number is a positive real number x such that the fractional parts of

$$x \left(\frac 3 2\right)^ n$$

are less than 1/2 for all positive integers n. Kurt Mahler conjectured in 1968 that there are no Z-numbers.

More generally, for a real number α, define Ω(α) as

$$\Omega(\alpha) = \inf_{\theta>0}\left({ \limsup_{n \rightarrow \infty} \left\lbrace{\theta\alpha^n}\right\rbrace - \liminf_{n \rightarrow \infty} \left\lbrace{\theta\alpha^n}\right\rbrace }\right).$$

Mahler's conjecture would follow if Ω(3/2) exceeds 1/2. Flatto, Lagarias, and Pollington showed that

$$\Omega\left(\frac p q\right) > \frac 1 p$$

for rational p/q > 1 in lowest terms.
