= Graceful (disambiguation) =

Being graceful is the physical characteristic of displaying "pretty agility".

Graceful may also refer to:

- Graceful 4, TSZX The Grace 's first Japanese album released on November 14, 2007
- Graceful & Charming, a song in The Hard and the Easy album by Great Big Sea
- Graceful exit, a simple programming idiom in a program to detect and manage a serious error condition
- Graceful labeling, a type of graph labeling
- Graceful degradation, a property enabling a system to continue operating properly in the event of the failure of some of its components
- Graceful World, a song by Japanese j-pop group Every Little Thing released on February 21, 2001
- A Gentleman's Guide to Graceful Living, a novel by Michael Dahlie
- Edge-graceful labeling, a type of graph labeling
- Saint Nerses the Graceful (1098–1173), a Catholicos of Armenia (1166–1173), theologian, poet, writer and hymn composer
- The Graceful Fallen Mango, an album by experimental rock band Dirty Projectors
- The Graceful Ghost, an album by Grey DeLisle released in 2004

== See also ==
- Gracilis (disambiguation), a Latin adjective with neither logical nor etymological connection to "graceful".
- Christy (given name), a given name meaning graceful
