= Windmill graph =

Graph family made by joining complete graphs at a universal node

- The Windmill graph Wd(5,4).
- Vertices: n(k − 1) + 1
- Edges: (nk(k − 1))/2
- Radius: 1
- Diameter: 2
- Girth: 3 if k > 2
- Chromatic number: k
- Chromatic index: n(k − 1)
- Notation: Wd(k,n)

In the mathematical field of graph theory, the windmill graph Wd(k,n) is an undirected graph constructed for k ≥ 2 and n ≥ 2 by joining n copies of the complete graph K_{k} at a shared universal vertex. That is, it is a 1-clique-sum of these complete graphs.

== Properties ==
It has n(k − 1) + 1 vertices and nk(k − 1)/2 edges, girth 3 (if k > 2), radius 1 and diameter 2. It has vertex connectivity 1 because its central vertex is an articulation point; however, like the complete graphs from which it is formed, it is (k − 1)-edge-connected. It is trivially perfect and a block graph.

== Special cases ==
By construction, the windmill graph Wd(3,n) is the friendship graph F_{n}, the windmill graph Wd(2,n) is the star graph S_{n} and the windmill graph Wd(3,2) is the butterfly graph.

== Labeling and colouring ==
The windmill graph has chromatic number k and chromatic index n(k − 1). Its chromatic polynomial can be deduced from the chromatic polynomial of the complete graph and is equal to

$$x\prod_{i=1}^{k-1}(x-i)^n.$$

The windmill graph Wd(k,n) is proved not graceful if k > 5. In 1979, Bermond has conjectured that Wd(4,n) is graceful for all n ≥ 4. Through an equivalence with perfect difference families, this has been proved for n ≤ 1000. Bermond, Kotzig, and Turgeon proved that Wd(k,n) is not graceful when k = 4 and n = 2 or n = 3, and when k = 5 and n = 2. The windmill Wd(3,n) is graceful if and only if n ≡ 0 (mod 4) or n ≡ 1 (mod 4).

== Gallery ==
Small windmill graphs.
