= Unicyclic =

Unicyclic may refer to:

- Unicyclic graph, a graph in mathematics with one cycle
- One-loop Feynman diagram, a type of pictorial representation in physics
- A cyclic compound in chemistry with one ring
