= Anton Kotzig =

Slovak-Canadian mathematician

- Born: 22 October 1919; Kočovce, Czechoslovak Republic
- Died: 20 April 1991 (aged 71); Montreal, Quebec, Canada
- Education: Comenius University in Bratislava
- Scientific career
- Fields: Mathematics

Anton Kotzig (22 October 1919 – 20 April 1991) was a Slovak–Canadian mathematician, expert in statistics, combinatorics and graph theory.

A number of his mathematical contributions are named after him. These include the Ringel–Kotzig conjecture on graceful labeling of trees (with Gerhard Ringel); Kotzig's conjecture on regularly path connected graphs; Kotzig's theorem on the degrees of vertices in convex polyhedra; as well as the Kotzig transformation.

== Biography ==
Kotzig was born in Kočovce, a village in Western Slovakia. He studied at the secondary grammar school in Nové Mesto nad Váhom, and began his undergraduate studies at the Charles University in Prague. After the closure of Czech universities in 1939, he moved to Bratislava where in 1943, he earned a doctoral degree (RNDr.) in Mathematical Statistics from the Comenius University. He remained in Bratislava working at the Central Bureau of Social Insurance for Slovakia as head of the Department of Mathematical Statistics.

Later, he published a book on economy planning. From 1951 to 1959, he lectured at Vysoká škola Ekonomická (today University of Economics in Bratislava), where he served as rector from 1952 to 1958. Thus he spent 20 years in close contact with applications of mathematics.

In 1959, he left the University of Economics to become head of the newly-created Mathematical Institute of the Slovak Academy of Sciences, where he remained until 1964. From 1965 to 1969, he was head of the department of the Applied Mathematics on Faculty of the Natural Sciences of Comenius University, where he was also dean for one year. He also earned a habilitation degree (DrSc.) from the Charles University in 1961 for a thesis on Graph Theory (relation and regular relation of finite graphs). Kotzig established the now well-known Slovak School of Graph Theory. One of his first students was Juraj Bosák who was awarded the Czechoslovak State Prize in 1969.

In 1969, Kotzig moved to Canada and spent a year at the University of Calgary. He became a researcher at the Centre de recherches mathematiques (CRM) and the University of Montreal in 1970, where he remained until his death. Because of the political situation, he could not travel back to Czechoslovakia, and remained in his adopted country without his books and notes. Although he was separated from his Slovak students, he continued doing mathematics.

He died on April 20, 1991 in Montreal, leaving his wife Edita and son Ľuboš.

== Contributions ==
By 1969, the list of his publications already included over 60 articles and 4 books. Many of his results have become classical, including results about graph relations, 1-factors and cubic graphs. As they were published only in Slovak, many of them remained unknown and some of the results were independently rediscovered much later by other mathematicians. In Canada, he wrote more than 75 additional articles. His publications cover a wide range of topics in graph theory and combinatorics: convex polyhedra, quasigroups, special decompositions into Hamiltonian paths, Latin squares, decompositions of complete graphs, perfect systems of difference sets, additive sequences of permutations, tournaments and combinatorial games theory.

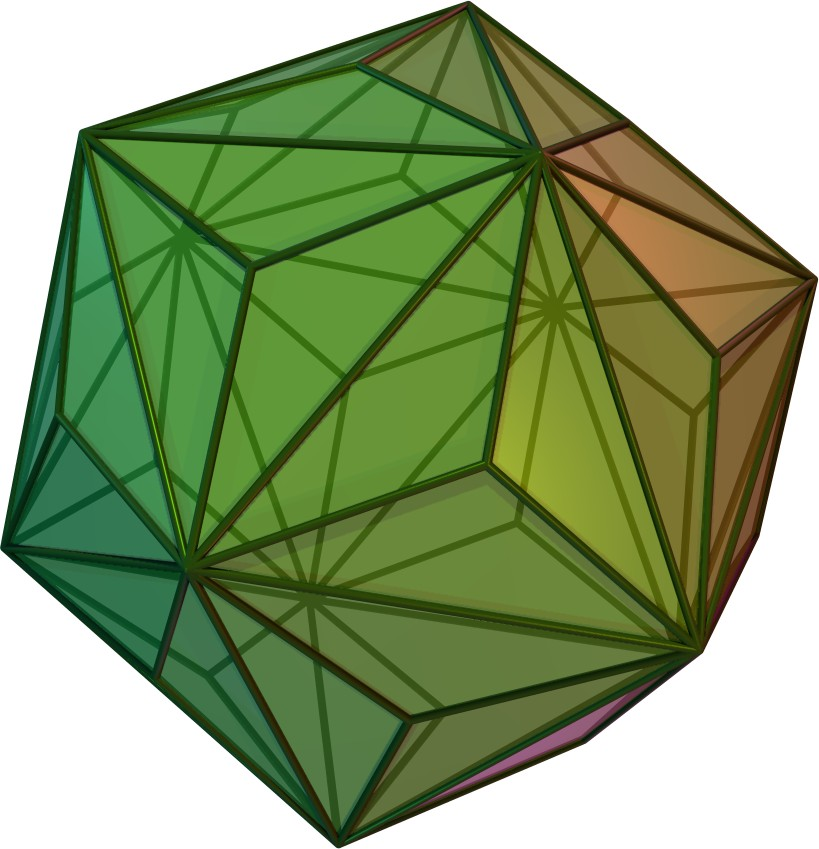
The triakis icosahedron, a polyhedron in which every edge has endpoints with total degree at least 13

One of his results, known as Kotzig's Theorem, is the statement that every polyhedral graph has an edge whose two endpoints have total degree at most 13. An extreme case is the triakis icosahedron, where no edge has smaller total degree. Kotzig published the result in Slovakia in 1955, and it was named and popularized in the West by Branko Grünbaum in the mid-1970s.

Kotzig published many open problems. One of them is the Ringel–Kotzig conjecture, stating that all trees have a graceful labeling. In 1963, Gerhard Ringel proposed that the complete graph $K_{2n+1}$ could be decomposed into isomorphic copies of any given $n$-vertex tree, and in 1966, Alexander Rosa credited Kotzig with the suggestion that a stronger decomposition always existed, equivalent to the existence of a graceful labeling. The question remains unsolved.

== Recognition ==
In honor of Kotzig's 60th birthday, Alexander Rosa, Gert Sabidussi and Jean Turgeon edited a festschrift, Theory and Practice of Combinatorics: A collection of articles honoring Anton Kotzig on the occasion of his sixtieth birthday (Annals of Discrete Mathematics 12, North-Holland, 1982), with contributions from experts from around the world.

In 1999, a commemorative plaque was erected on his birth house in Kočovce on the 80th anniversary of his birth.

== See also ==
- Kotzig transformations
- Ringel-Kotzig conjecture
