= Kôdi Husimi =

Japanese physicist

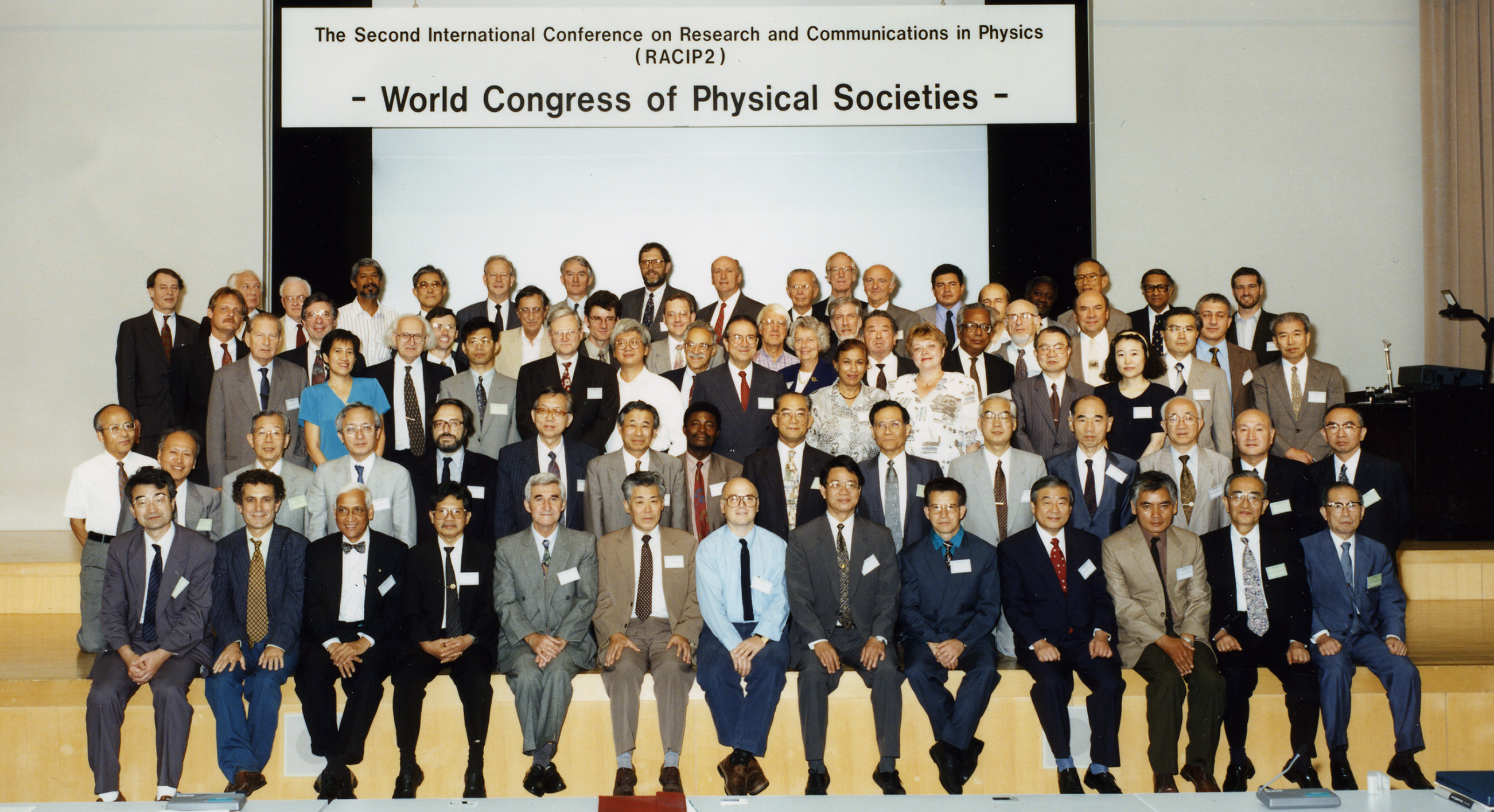
- Husimi at the Second International Conference on Research and Communications in Physics
- Born: 29 June 1909
- Died: 8 May 2008 (aged 98)
- Education: Tokyo University
- Scientific career
- Workplaces: Osaka University; Nagoya University

Kôdi Husimi (June 29, 1909 – May 8, 2008, Japanese: 伏見康治) was a Japanese theoretical physicist who served as the president of the Science Council of Japan. Husimi trees in graph theory, the Husimi Q representation in quantum mechanics, and Husimi's theorem in the mathematics of paper folding are named after him.

== Education and career ==
Husimi studied at the University of Tokyo, graduating in 1933. He spent a year there as an assistant, and then moved to Osaka University in 1934, where he soon began working with Seishi Kikuchi. At Osaka, he became Dean of the Faculty of Science. He moved to Nagoya University in 1961, and directed the plasma institute there. He retired in 1973, and became a professor emeritus of both Nagoya and Osaka.

== Contributions ==
=== Physics ===
A 1940 paper by Husimi introduced the Husimi Q representation in quantum mechanics. Husimi also gave the name to the kagome lattice, frequently used in statistical mechanics.

=== Graph theory ===
In the mathematical area of graph theory, the name "Husimi tree" has come to refer to two different kinds of graphs: cactus graphs (the graphs in which each edge belongs to at most one cycle) and block graphs (the graphs in which, for every cycle, all diagonals of the cycle are edges). Husimi studied cactus graphs in a 1950 paper, and the name "Husimi trees" was given to these graphs in a later paper by Frank Harary and George Eugene Uhlenbeck. Due to an error by later researchers, the name came to be applied to block graphs as well, causing it to become ambiguous and fall into disuse.

=== Pacifism and world affairs ===
Husimi was an early member of the Science Council of Japan, joining it in 1949, and it was largely through his efforts that the Science Council in 1954 issued a statement proposing principles for the peaceful use of nuclear power and opposing the continued existence of nuclear weapons. This statement, in turn, led to the Japanese law outlawing military uses of nuclear technology. Later, he served as president of the Science Council of Japan from 1977 to 1982. He was also a frequent participant in the Pugwash Conferences on Science and World Affairs and a leader of the Committee of Seven for World Peace.

=== Recreational mathematics ===
Husimi's recreational interests included origami; he designed several variations of the traditional orizuru (paper crane), folded on paper shaped as a rhombus instead of the usual square, and studied the properties of the bird base that allow it to be varied within a continuous family of deformations. With his wife, Mitsue Husimi, he wrote a book on the mathematics of origami, which included a theorem characterizing the folding patterns with four folds meeting at a single vertex that may be folded flat. The generalization of this theorem to arbitrary numbers of folds at a single vertex is sometimes called Husimi's theorem.
