= Threshold graph =

Graph formed by adding isolated or universal vertices

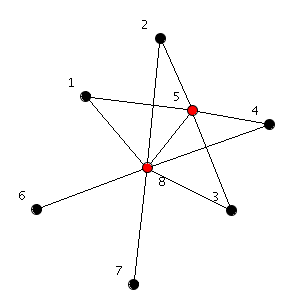
An example of a threshold graph.

In graph theory, a threshold graph is a graph that can be constructed from a one-vertex graph by repeated applications of the following two operations:

1. Addition of a single isolated vertex to the graph.
2. Addition of a single dominating vertex to the graph, i.e. a single vertex that is connected to all other vertices.

For example, the graph of the figure is a threshold graph. It can be constructed by beginning with a single-vertex graph (vertex 1), and then adding black vertices as isolated vertices and red vertices as dominating vertices, in the order in which they are numbered.

Threshold graphs were first introduced by Chvátal & Hammer (1977). A chapter on threshold graphs appears in Golumbic (1980), and the book Mahadev & Peled (1995) is devoted to them.

== Alternative definitions ==
An equivalent definition is the following: a graph is a threshold graph if there are a real number $S$ and for each vertex $v$ a real vertex weight $w(v)$ such that for any two vertices $v,u$, $uv$ is an edge if and only if $w(u)+w(v)> S$.

Another equivalent definition is this: a graph is a threshold graph if there are a real number $T$ and for each vertex $v$ a real vertex weight $a(v)$ such that for any vertex set $X\subseteq V$, $X$ is independent if and only if $\sum_{v \in X} a(v) \le T.$

The name "threshold graph" comes from these definitions: S is the "threshold" for the property of being an edge, or equivalently T is the threshold for being independent.

Threshold graphs also have a forbidden graph characterization: A graph is a threshold graph if and only if it no four of its vertices form an induced subgraph that is a three-edge path graph, a four-edge cycle graph, or a two-edge matching.

== Decomposition ==
From the definition which uses repeated addition of vertices, one can derive an alternative way of uniquely describing a threshold graph, by means of a string of symbols. $\epsilon$ is always the first character of the string, and represents the first vertex of the graph. Every subsequent character is either $u$, which denotes the addition of an isolated vertex (or union vertex), or $j$, which denotes the addition of a dominating vertex (or join vertex). For example, the string $\epsilon u u j$ represents a star graph with three leaves, while $\epsilon u j$ represents a path on three vertices. The graph of the figure can be represented as $\epsilon uuujuuj$

== Related classes of graphs and recognition ==
Threshold graphs are a special case of cographs, split graphs, and trivially perfect graphs. A graph is a threshold graph if and only if it is both a cograph and a split graph. Every graph that is both a trivially perfect graph and the complementary graph of a trivially perfect graph is a threshold graph. Threshold graphs are also a special case of interval graphs. All these relations can be explained in terms of their characterisation by forbidden induced subgraphs. A cograph is a graph with no induced path on four vertices, P_{4}, and a threshold graph is a graph with no induced P_{4}, C_{4} nor 2K_{2}. C_{4} is a cycle of four vertices and 2K_{2} is its complement, that is, two disjoint edges. This also explains why threshold graphs are closed under taking complements; the P_{4} is self-complementary, hence if a graph is P_{4}-, C_{4}- and 2K_{2}-free, its complement is as well.

Heggernes & Kratsch (2007) showed that threshold graphs can be recognized in linear time; if a graph is not threshold, an obstruction (one of P_{4}, C_{4}, or 2K_{2}) will be output.

== See also ==
- Indifference graph
- Series–parallel graph
- Threshold hypergraphs
