= Thrackle =

Graph drawn with all edges intersecting

A thrackle is an embedding of a graph in the plane in which each edge is a Jordan arc and every pair of edges meet exactly once. Edges may either meet at a common endpoint, or, if they have no endpoints in common, at a point in their interiors. In the latter case, they must cross at their intersection point: the intersection must be transverse.

A special case of thrackles, the linear thrackles, restrict the edges to be drawn as straight line segments. One method for constructing a linear thrackle with any given set of points as vertices is to form an edge between each farthest pair of points. For a linear thrackle, each connected component contains at most one cycle, from which it follows that the number of edges is at most equal to the number of vertices.

John H. Conway conjectured more generally that every thrackle has at most as many edges as vertices. It is known that the number of edges is at most a constant times the number of vertices.

== Linear thrackles ==
Four Reinhardt polygons. Their diameters (blue) form linear thrackles.

A linear thrackle is a thrackle drawn in such a way that its edges are straight line segments. As Paul Erdős observed, every linear thrackle has at most as many edges as vertices. Erdős's proof involves considering the special case of a linear thrackle that contains a vertex $v$ that forms the endpoint of three or more edges $vw$, $vx$, and $vy$. If two of these edges belonged to the same line, then no other edge could cross both, so at least one of these three edges (say $vw$) must lie on a line that separates two other edges. Then, $w$ must have degree one, because no line segment ending at $w$, other than $vw$, can touch both $vx$ and $vy$. Removing $w$ and $vw$ produces a smaller thrackle, without changing the difference between the numbers of edges and vertices. After removals like this lead to a thrackle in which every vertex has at most two neighbors, by the handshaking lemma the number of edges is at most the number of vertices.

Based on Erdős' proof, one can infer that every linear thrackle is a pseudoforest, that is, a graph in which each connected component has at most one cycle. There exist linear thrackles in the form of cycles of each odd length. However, no linear thrackle can contain an even-length cycle. For, if one edge of a linear thrackle in the form of a cycle is chosen arbitrarily, then the other cycle vertices must lie alternatingly on opposite sides of the line through this edge. For an even cycle this alternation would cause the two edges adjacent to the chosen edge to be separated from each other by the line through the chosen edge.

Micha Perles provided another simple proof that $n$-vertex linear thrackles have at most $n$ edges, based on the fact that in a linear thrackle every edge has an endpoint at which the edges span an angle of at most 180°, and for which it is the most clockwise edge within this span. For, if an edge of a linear thrackle did not have this property, there would be two edges, incident to opposite endpoints of the edge and lying on opposite sides of the line through the edge, which could not cross each other. But each vertex can only have this property with respect to a single edge, so the number of edges is at most equal to the number of vertices.

As Erdős also observed, the set of pairs of points realizing the diameter of a point set must form a linear thrackle: no two diameters can be disjoint from each other, because if they were then their four endpoints would have a pair at farther distance apart than the two disjoint edges. For this reason, every set of $n$ points in the plane can have at most $n$ diametral pairs, answering a question posed in 1934 by Heinz Hopf and Erika Pannwitz. Andrew Vázsonyi conjectured bounds on the number of diameter pairs in higher dimensions, generalizing this problem.

In computational geometry, the method of rotating calipers can be used to form a linear thrackle from any set of points in convex position, by connecting pairs of points that support parallel lines tangent to the convex hull of the points. This graph contains as a subgraph the thrackle of diameter pairs.

The diameters of the Reinhardt polygons form linear thrackles with equal numbers of edges and vertices. An enumeration of linear thrackles may be used to solve the biggest little polygon problem, of finding an $n$-gon with maximum area relative to its diameter.

== Thrackle conjecture ==
Unsolved problem in mathematics
Can a thrackle have more edges than vertices?
More unsolved problems in mathematics

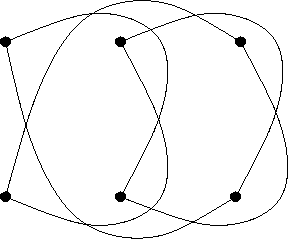
A thrackle embedding of a 6-cycle graph.

John H. Conway conjectured that, in any thrackle, the number of edges is at most equal to the number of vertices. Conway himself used the terminology paths and spots (for edges and vertices respectively), so Conway's thrackle conjecture was originally stated in the form every thrackle has at least as many spots as paths. Conway offered a $1000 prize for proving or disproving this conjecture, as part of a set of prize problems also including Conway's 99-graph problem, the minimum spacing of Danzer sets, and the winner of Sylver coinage after the move 16.

Equivalently, the thrackle conjecture may be stated as every thrackle is a pseudoforest. More specifically, if the thrackle conjecture is true, the thrackles may be exactly characterized by a result of Woodall: they are the pseudoforests in which there is no cycle of length four and at most one odd cycle.

It has been proved that every cycle graph other than a four-vertex cycle $C_4$ has a thrackle embedding, which shows that the conjecture is sharp. That is, there are thrackles having the same number of spots as paths. At the other extreme, the worst-case scenario is that the number of spots is twice the number of paths; this is also attainable.

The thrackle conjecture is known to be true for thrackles drawn in such a way that every edge is an $x$-monotone curve, crossed at most once by every vertical line.

== Known bounds ==
Lovász, Pach & Szegedy (1997) proved that every bipartite thrackle is a planar graph, although not drawn in a planar way. As a consequence, they show that every thrackleable graph with $n$ vertices has at most $2n-3$ edges. Since then, this bound has been improved several times. The current record is $1.393n$. For every $\varepsilon>0$ there is finite algorithm that either improves the bound to $(1+\varepsilon)n$ or disproves the thrackle conjecture.

If the conjecture is false, a minimal counterexample would have the form of two even cycles sharing a vertex. Therefore, to prove the conjecture, it would suffice to prove that graphs of this type cannot be drawn as thrackles.

== Generalized thrackles ==
A significant relaxation of the standard thrackle definition is the generalized thrackle. In a generalized thrackle drawing, any pair of edges is required to intersect an odd number of times. These intersections can be either at a shared vertex or at a proper crossing point. This contrasts with a strict thrackle, where every pair of edges must meet exactly once. Consequently, every thrackle is also a generalized thrackle, but the reverse is not true. A notable example is the four-vertex cycle $C_4$, which cannot be drawn as a thrackle but can be drawn as a generalized thrackle.

The properties of generalized thrackles differ significantly from those conjectured for standard thrackles. While Conway's conjecture posits that a thrackle on $n$ vertices can have at most $n$ edges, generalized thrackles can be denser. Using the convention that $n$ represents the number of vertices and $m$ the number of edges in a graph, the upper bound for the number of edges in a generalized thrackle is $m\le 2n-2$. A key result in this area is that a bipartite graph can be drawn as a generalized thrackle if and only if it is planar. For non-bipartite graphs, the ability to be drawn as a generalized thrackle is related to the concept of a parity embedding on a non-orientable surface.

A related but slightly different relaxation is the quasi-thrackle. A quasi-thrackle is a type of generalized thrackle with an additional constraint: while non-adjacent edges can cross an odd number of times, edges that share a vertex are only allowed to intersect at that common vertex and nowhere else. This makes the definition of a quasi-thrackle stricter than that of a generalized thrackle, but still more relaxed than a standard thrackle. The maximum number of edges in a quasi-thrackle with $n$ vertices has been established to be $\tfrac32(n-1)$, a bound that is known to be the best possible for an infinite number of values of $n$.
