= Kotzig's conjecture =

Each pair of points in the left graph is connected by exactly one path of length 1, and each pair in the right graph is connected by exactly one path of length 2. These are the cases $k = 1$ and $k = 2$ respectively, but no graphs with $k\ge 3$ have been found. It is known that if another does exist, it must be where $k > 20$.

Unsolved problem in mathematics
Is there a finite graph on at least two vertices in which each pair of distinct vertices is connected by exactly one path of length $k$, where $k\ge 3$ is fixed?
More unsolved problems in mathematics

Kotzig's conjecture is an unproven assertion in graph theory which states that finite graphs with certain properties do not exist. A graph is a $P_k$-graph if each pair of distinct vertices is connected by exactly one path of length $k$. Kotzig's conjecture asserts that for $k\ge 3$ there are no finite $P_k$-graphs with two or more vertices. The conjecture was first formulated by Anton Kotzig in 1974. It has been verified for $k\le 20$, but remains open in the general case (as of July 2026).

The conjecture is stated for $k\ge 3$ because $P_k$-graphs do exist for smaller values of $k$. $P_1$-graphs are precisely the complete graphs. The friendship theorem states that $P_2$-graphs are precisely the (triangular) windmill graphs (that is, finitely many triangles joined at a common vertex; also known as friendship graphs).

== History ==
Kotzig's conjecture was first listed as an open problem by Bondy & Murty in 1976, attributed to Kotzig and dated to 1974. Kotzig's first own writing on the conjecture appeared in 1979. He later verified the conjecture for $k\le 8$ and claimed solution, though unpublished, for $k\le 9$. The conjecture is now known to hold for $k\le 20$ due to work of Alexandr Kostochka. Kostochka stated that his techniques extend to $k\le 33$, but a proof of this has not been published. A survey on $P_k$-graphs was written by John A. Bondy, including proofs for many statements previously made by Kotzig without written proof.

In 1990 Xing & Hu claimed a proof of Kotzig's conjecture for $k\ge 12$. This seemed to resolve the conjecture at the time, and still today leads many to believe that the problem is settled. However, Xing and Hu's proof relied on a misunderstanding of a statement proven by Kotzig. Kotzig showed that a $P_k$-graph must contain a $2\ell$-cycle for some $\ell\in\{3,...,k-4\}$, which Xing and Hu used in the form that cycles of all these lengths must exist. In their paper Xing and Hu show that for $k\ge 12$ a $P_k$-graph must not contain a $(2k-8)$-cycle. Since this is in contradiction to their reading of Kotzig's result, they conclude (incorrectly) that $P_k$-graphs with $k\ge 12$ cannot exist. This mistake was first pointed out by Roland Häggkvist in 2000.

Kotzig's conjecture is mentioned in Proofs from THE BOOK in the chapter on the friendship theorem. It is stated that a general proof for the conjecture seems "out of reach".

== Properties of $P_k$-graphs ==
- A $P_k$-graph on $n$ vertices contains precisely $\textstyle {n\choose 2}$ paths of length $k$.
- Since the two end-vertices of an edge in a $P_k$-graph are connected by a unique $k$-path, each edge is contained in a unique $(k+1)$-cycle. Consequently, the graph has a unique decomposition into edge disjoint $(k+1)$-cycles, and there are no other $(k+1)$-cycles besides these. In particular, $P_k$-graphs are Eulerian.
- $P_k$-graphs are not bipartite: if $k$ is odd and $v,w$ are vertices in the same bipartition class, no $k$-path can connect them. Likewise, if $k$ is even and $v,w$ are vertices in different bipartition classes, no $k$-path can connect them.
- Even cycles form important substructures in $P_k$-graphs. A lollipop (not to be confused with a lollipop graph) is the union of a cycle with a path intersecting in precisely one of the end vertices of the path. If the cycle has length $2\ell$, then the path must be shorter than $k-\ell$ as it would otherwise give rise to two $k$-paths with the same end vertices. Therefore, the existence and distribution of lollipops, and more generally, of even cycles, has been studied extensively. It is known that there must exist an even cycle of length $2\ell$ for some $\ell\in\{3,...,k-5\}$, and that there cannot exist even cycles of lengths $4$, $2k$, $2k-2$, $2k-4$, $2k-6$ or $2k-8$.
- A $P_k$-graph cannot contain a cycle (even or odd) of length at least $\tfrac43 k-2$. At the same time, there must exist a cycle of length at least $k+5$. Combining these constraints yield $k\ge 21$.
- Any two $(k+1)$-cycles in a $P_k$-graph must have at least three and at most $k-2$ vertices in common. In particular, all $P_k$-graphs are 2-connected. Kotzig furthermore claims that any two $(k+1)$-cycles have at least seven vertices in common, though no proof has been published.
- Let $c_{k+1}$ denote the number of $(k+1)$-cycles in a given $P_k$-graph. Then $c_{k+1}\ge 3$. If $k$ is even, then $c_{k+1}\ge 4$. If $k$ is odd, then $c_{k+1}\le \tfrac12(k-1)$. Consequently, the number of edges in a $P_k$-graph (for $k$ odd) is bounded, and since $P_k$-graphs are connected, so is the number of vertices.
