= Kotzig's theorem =

Theorem in graph theory and polyhedral combinatorics

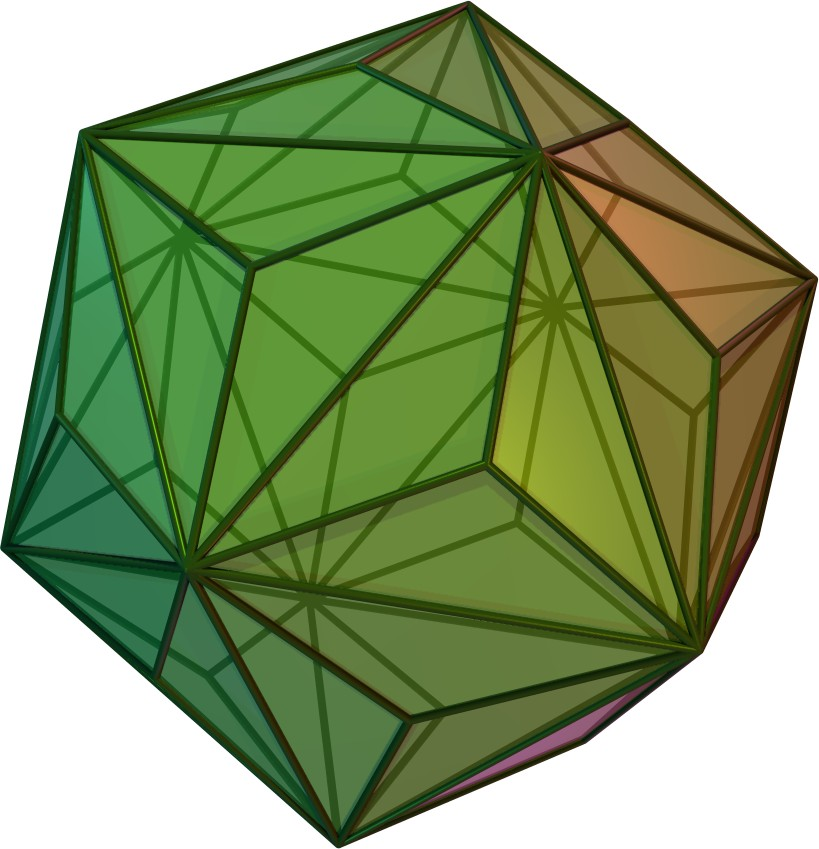
The triakis icosahedron, a polyhedron in which every edge has endpoints with total degree at least 13

In graph theory and polyhedral combinatorics, areas of mathematics, Kotzig's theorem is the statement that every polyhedral graph has an edge whose two endpoints have total degree at most 13. An extreme case is the triakis icosahedron, where no edge has smaller total degree. The result is named after Anton Kotzig, who published it in 1955 in the dual form that every convex polyhedron has two adjacent faces with a total of at most 13 sides. It was named and popularized in the west in the 1970s by Branko Grünbaum.

More generally, every planar graph of minimum degree at least three either has an edge of total degree at most 12, or at least 60 edges that (like the edges in the triakis icosahedron) connect vertices of degrees 3 and 10. If all triangular faces of a polyhedron are vertex-disjoint, there exists an edge with smaller total degree, at most eight. Generalizations of the theorem are also known for graph embeddings onto surfaces with higher genus.

The theorem cannot be generalized to all planar graphs, as the complete bipartite graphs $K_{1,n-1}$ and $K_{2,n-2}$ have edges with unbounded total degree. However, for planar graphs with vertices of degree lower than three, variants of the theorem have been proven, showing that either there is an edge of bounded total degree or some other special kind of subgraph.
