= Kočovce =

- Municipality
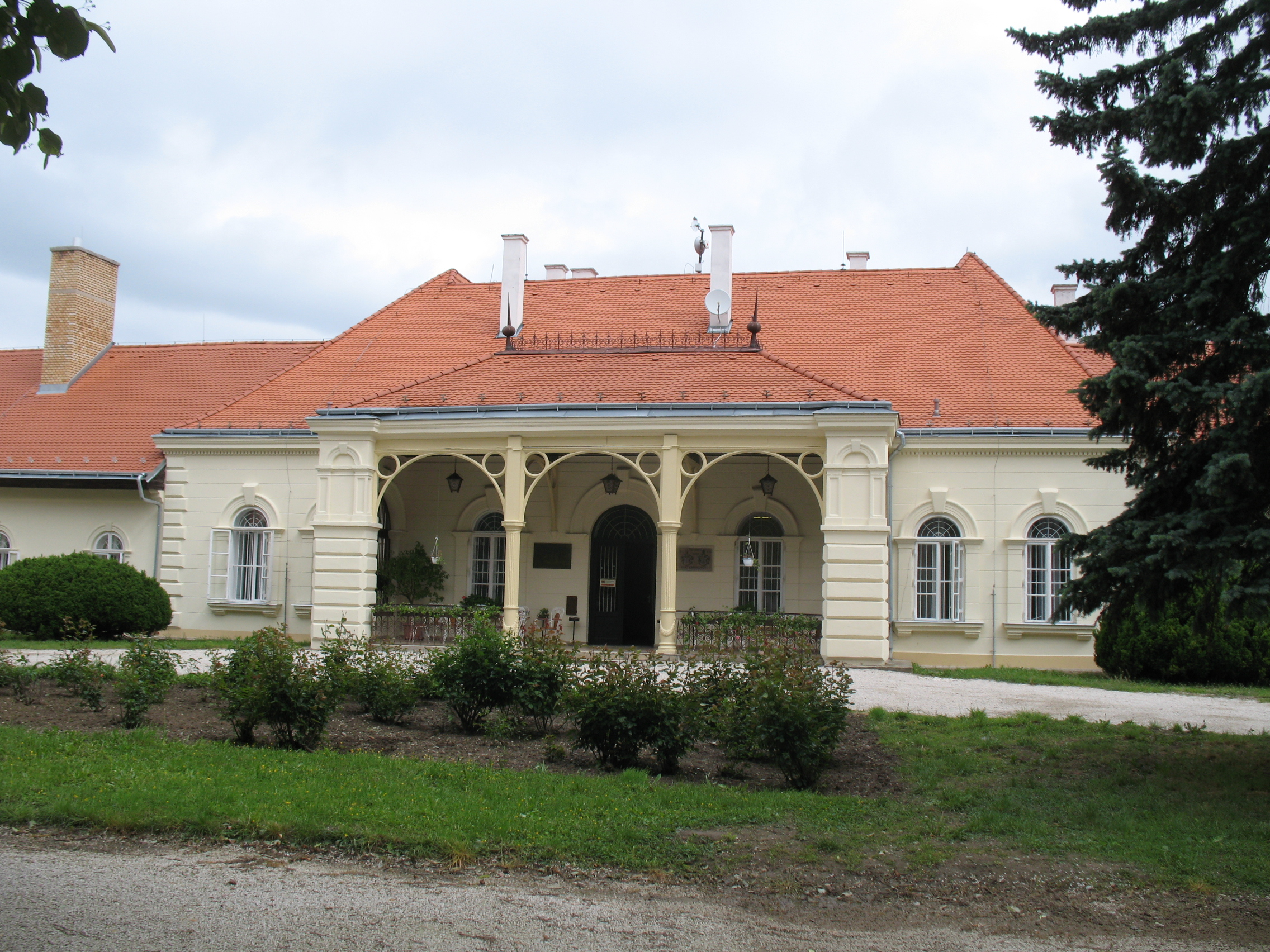

- Flag

- Location of Kočovce in the Trenčín Region Location of Kočovce in Slovakia
- Coordinates: 48.75°N 17.88°E
- Country: Slovakia
- Region: Trenčín Region
- District: Nové Mesto nad Váhom District
- First mentioned: 1262

Area
  - Total: 15.31 km^{2} (5.91 sq mi)
- Elevation: 184 m (604 ft)

Population (2025)
  - Total: 1,873
- Time zone: UTC+1 (CET)
  - Summer (DST): UTC+2 (CEST)
- Postal code: 916 31
- Area code: +421 32
- Vehicle registration plate (until 2022): NM
- Website: www.kocovce.sk

Kočovce (Hungarian: Kocsóc) is a village and municipality in Nové Mesto nad Váhom District in the Trenčín Region of western Slovakia.

== History ==
In historical records the village was first mentioned in 1262. Before the establishment of independent Czechoslovakia in 1918, Kočovce was part of Trencsén County within the Kingdom of Hungary. From 1939 to 1945, it was part of the Slovak Republic.

== Geography ==
The municipality lies at an altitude of 184 metres (604 ft) and covers an area of 15.31 km^{2} (5.91 sq mi) (2025).

== Population ==
Population statistic (10 years)
Year	1995	2005	2015	2025
Count	1355	1391	1510	1873
Difference		+2.65%	+8.55%	+24.03%

Population statistic
Year	2024	2025
Count	1845	1873
Difference		+1.51%

It has a population of 1873 people (31 December 2025).

=== Ethnicity ===
Census 2021 (1+ %)
Ethnicity	Number	Fraction
Slovak	1588	97.36%
Not found out	30	1.83%
Total	1631	

In year 2021 was 1631 people by ethnicity 1588 as Slovak, 30 as Not found out, 13 as Czech, 8 as Other, 4 as Polish, 3 as Russian, 3 as English, 2 as German, 2 as Hungarian, 2 as French and 1 as Rusyn.

Note on population: The difference values of population numbers in the table "Population statistic" and in the sections "Ethnicity" & "Religion" is caused by the use of various statistical methods.

=== Religion ===
Census 2021 (1+ %)
Religion	Number	Fraction
Roman Catholic Church	1040	63.76%
None	396	24.28%
Evangelical Church	115	7.05%
Not found out	37	2.27%
Total	1631	

In year 2021 was 1631 people by religion 1040 from Roman Catholic Church, 396 from None, 115 from Evangelical Church, 37 from Not found out, 14 from Apostolic Church, 10 from Greek Catholic Church, 5 from Ad hoc movements, 4 from Buddhism, 3 from Eastern Orthodox Church, 2 from Islam, 2 from Other, 1 from Paganism and natural spirituality, 1 from Other and not ascertained christian church and 1 from Seventh-day Adventist Church.

== Genealogical resources ==
The records for genealogical research are available at the state archive "Statny Archiv in Bratislava, Slovakia"

- Roman Catholic church records (births/marriages/deaths): 1788-1896 (parish B)
- Lutheran church records (births/marriages/deaths): 1792-1942 (parish B)

== See also ==
- List of municipalities and towns in Slovakia
