= Universal vertex =

Vertex adjacent to all others in a graph

A graph with a universal vertex, u

In graph theory, a universal vertex is a vertex of an undirected graph that is adjacent to all other vertices of the graph. It may also be called a dominating vertex, as it forms a one-element dominating set in the graph. A graph that contains a universal vertex may be called a cone, and its universal vertex may be called the apex of the cone. This terminology should be distinguished from the unrelated usage of these words for universal quantifiers in the logic of graphs, and for apex graphs.

Graphs that contain a universal vertex include the stars, trivially perfect graphs, and friendship graphs. For wheel graphs (the graphs of pyramids), and graphs of higher-dimensional pyramidal polytopes, the vertex at the apex of the pyramid is universal. When a graph contains a universal vertex, it is a cop-win graph, and almost all cop-win graphs contain a universal vertex.

The number of labeled graphs containing a universal vertex can be counted by inclusion–exclusion, showing that there are an odd number of such graphs on any even number of vertices. This, in turn, can be used to show that the property of having a universal vertex is evasive: testing this property may require checking the adjacency of all pairs of vertices. However, a universal vertex can be recognized immediately from its degree: in an $n$-vertex graph, it has degree $n-1$. Universal vertices can be described by a short logical formula, which has been used in graph algorithms for related properties.

== In special families of graphs ==
Four types of graph with a universal vertex: a star (upper left), wheel graph (upper right), friendship graph (lower left), and threshold graph (lower right). In each example the universal vertex is the center yellow vertex.

The stars are exactly the trees that have a universal vertex, and may be constructed by adding a universal vertex to an independent set. The wheel graphs may be formed by adding a universal vertex to a cycle graph. The trivially perfect graphs are obtained from rooted trees by adding an edge connecting every ancestor–descendant pair in the tree. These always contain a universal vertex, the root of the tree. More strongly they may be characterized as the finite graphs in which every connected induced subgraph contains a universal vertex. The connected threshold graphs form a subclass of the trivially perfect graphs, so they also contain a universal vertex. They may be defined as the graphs that can be formed by repeated addition of either a universal vertex or an isolated vertex (one with no incident edges).

In geometry, the three-dimensional pyramids have wheel graphs as their skeletons, and more generally a higher-dimensional pyramid is a polytope whose faces of all dimensions connect an apex vertex to all the faces of a lower-dimensional base, including all of the vertices of the base. The polytope is said to be pyramidal at its apex, and it may have more than one apex. However, the existence of neighborly polytopes means that the graph of a polytope may have a universal vertex, or all vertices universal, without the polytope itself being a pyramid.

The friendship theorem states that, if every two vertices in a finite graph have exactly one shared neighbor, then the graph contains a universal vertex. The graphs described by this theorem are the friendship graphs, formed by systems of triangles connected together at a common shared vertex, the universal vertex. The assumption that the graph is finite is important; there exist infinite graphs in which every two vertices have one shared neighbor, but with no universal vertex.

Every finite graph with a universal vertex is a dismantlable graph, meaning that it can be reduced to a single vertex by repeatedly removing a vertex whose closed neighborhood is a subset of another vertex's closed neighborhood. In a graph with a universal vertex, any removal sequence that leaves the universal vertex in place, removing all of the other vertices, fits this definition. Almost all dismantlable graphs have a universal vertex, in the sense that the fraction of $n$-vertex dismantlable graphs that have a universal vertex tends to one in the limit as $n$ goes to infinity. The dismantlable graphs are also called cop-win graphs, because the side playing the cop wins a certain cop-and-robber game defined on these graphs.

When a graph has a universal vertex, the vertex set consisting only of that vertex is a dominating set, a set that includes or is adjacent to every vertex. For this reason, in the context of dominating set problems, a universal vertex may also be called a dominating vertex. For the strong product of graphs $G\boxtimes H$, the domination numbers $\gamma(G)$ and $\gamma(H)$ obey the inequalities
$$\max\{\gamma(G),\gamma(H)\}\le \gamma(G\boxtimes H)\le\gamma(G)\gamma(H).$$
This implies that a strong product has a dominating vertex if and only if both of its factors do; in this case the upper bound on its dominating number is one, and in any other case the lower bound is greater than one.

== Combinatorial enumeration ==
The number of labeled graphs with $n$ vertices, at least one of which is universal (or equivalently isolated, in the complement graph) can be counted by the inclusion–exclusion principle, in which one counts the graphs in which one chosen vertex is universal, then corrects for overcounting by subtracting the counts for graphs with two chosen universal vertices, then adding the counts for graphs with three chosen universal vertices, etc. This produces the formula

$\displaystyle\sum_{k=1}^n (-1)^{k+1} \binom{n}{k} 2^{\tbinom{n-k}{2}}.$

In each term of the sum, $k$ is the number of vertices chosen to be universal, and $\tbinom{n}{k}$ is the number of ways to make this choice. $\tbinom{n-k}{2}$ is the number of pairs of vertices that do not include a chosen universal vertex, and taking this number as the exponent of a power of two counts the number of graphs with the chosen vertices as universal.

Starting from $n=1$, these numbers of graphs are:

1, 1, 4, 23, 256, 5319, 209868, 15912975, 2343052576, 675360194287, ... (sequence A327367 in the OEIS).

For $n>1$, these numbers are odd when $n$ is even, and vice versa. The unlabeled version of this graph enumeration problem is trivial, in the sense that the number of $n$-vertex unlabeled graphs with a universal vertex is the same as the number of $(n-1)$-vertex graphs.

== Recognition ==
In a graph with $n$ vertices, a universal vertex is a vertex whose degree is exactly $n-1$.

The property of having a universal vertex can be expressed by a formula in the first-order logic of graphs. Using $\sim$ to indicate the adjacency relation in a graph, a graph $G$ has a universal vertex if and only if it models the formula
$$\exists u\forall v\bigl( (u\ne v)\Rightarrow (u\sim v)\bigr).$$
The existence of this formula, and its small number of alternations between universal and existential quantifers, can be used in a fixed-parameter tractable algorithm for testing whether all components of a graph can be made to have universal vertices by $k$ steps of removing a vertex from each component.

The property of having a universal vertex (or equivalently an isolated vertex) has been considered with respect to the Aanderaa–Karp–Rosenberg conjecture on how many queries (subroutine calls) are needed to test whether a labeled graph has a property, given access to the graph only through a subroutine that can test whether two given vertices are adjacent. In a graph with $n$ vertices, one can determine the entire graph, and test any property, using $\tbinom{n}{2}$ queries. A graph property is evasive if no algorithm can test the property guaranteeing fewer queries. Testing the existence of a universal vertex is evasive, on graphs with an even number of vertices. There are an odd number of these graphs that have a universal vertex. A testing algorithm can be forced to query all pairs of vertices by an adjacency subroutine that always answers in such a way as to leave an odd number of remaining graphs that have a universal vertex. Until all edges are tested, the total number of remaining graphs will be even, so the algorithm will be unable to determine whether the graph it is querying has a universal vertex.
