= Wheel graph =

Cycle graph plus universal vertex

- Several examples of wheel graphs
- Vertices: n ≥ 4
- Edges: 2(n − 1)
- Diameter: 2 if n > 4; 1 if n = 4
- Girth: 3
- Chromatic number: 3 if n is odd 4 if n is even
- Spectrum: $\{2\cos(2k\pi / (n - 1))^1;$ $k = 1, \ldots, n - 2\}$$\cup\{1 \pm \sqrt{n}\}$
- Properties: Hamiltonian; Self-dual; Planar
- Notation: W_{n}

In graph theory, a wheel graph is a graph formed by connecting a single universal vertex to all vertices of a cycle. A wheel graph with n vertices can also be defined as the 1-skeleton of an (n − 1)-gonal pyramid.

Some authors write W_{n} to denote a wheel graph with n vertices (n ≥ 4); other authors instead use W_{n} to denote a wheel graph with n + 1 vertices (n ≥ 3), which is formed by connecting a single vertex to all vertices of a cycle of length n. The former notation is used in the rest of this article and in the table on the right.

== Edge Set ==
{{1, 2}, {1, 3}, …, {1, v}, {2, 3}, {3, 4}, …, {v − 1, v}, {v, 2}} would be the edge set of a wheel graph with vertex set {1, 2, …, v} in which the vertex 1 is a universal vertex.

== Properties ==
Wheel graphs are planar graphs, and have a unique planar embedding. More specifically, every wheel graph is a Halin graph. They are self-dual: the planar dual of any wheel graph is an isomorphic graph. Every maximal planar graph, other than K_{4} = W_{4}, contains as a subgraph either W_{5} or W_{6}.

There is always a Hamiltonian cycle in the wheel graph and there are $n^2-3n+3$ cycles in W_{n} (sequence A002061 in the OEIS).

The 7 cycles of the wheel graph W_{4}.

For odd values of n, W_{n} is a perfect graph with chromatic number 3: the vertices of the cycle can be given two colors, and the center vertex given a third color. For even n, W_{n} has chromatic number 4, and (when n ≥ 6) is not perfect. W_{7} is the only wheel graph that is a unit distance graph in the Euclidean plane.

The chromatic polynomial of the wheel graph W_{n} is :

$$P_{W_n}(x) = x((x - 2)^{(n - 1)} - (-1)^n(x - 2)).$$

In matroid theory, two particularly important special classes of matroids are the wheel matroids and the whirl matroids, both derived from wheel graphs. The k-wheel matroid is the graphic matroid of a wheel W_{k+1}, while the k-whirl matroid is derived from the k-wheel by considering the outer cycle of the wheel, as well as all of its spanning trees, to be independent.

The wheel W_{6} supplied a counterexample to a conjecture of Paul Erdős on Ramsey theory: he had conjectured that the complete graph has the smallest Ramsey number among all graphs with the same chromatic number, but Faudree and McKay (1993) showed W_{6} has Ramsey number 17 while the complete graph with the same chromatic number, K_{4}, has Ramsey number 18. That is, for every 17-vertex graph G, either G or its complement contains W_{6} as a subgraph, while neither the 17-vertex Paley graph nor its complement contains a copy of K_{4}.
