= Edge-graceful labeling =

Type of graph labeling

In graph theory, an edge-graceful labeling is a type of graph labeling for simple, connected graphs in which no two distinct edges connect the same two distinct vertices and no edge connects a vertex to itself.

Edge-graceful labelings were first introduced by Sheng-Ping Lo in his seminal paper.

== Definition ==
Given a graph G, we denote the set of its edges by E(G) and that of its vertices by V(G). Let q be the cardinality of E(G) and p be that of V(G). Once a labeling of the edges is given, a vertex of the graph is labeled by the sum of the labels of the edges incident to it, modulo p. Or, in symbols, the induced labeling on a vertex is given by

$$V(u)=\Sigma E(e) \mod |V(G)|$$

where V(u) is the resulting value for the vertex u and E(e) is the existing value of an edge e incident to u.

The problem is to find a labeling for the edges such that all the labels from 1 to q are used once and that the induced labels on the vertices run from 0 to p − 1. In other words, the resulting set of labels for the edges should be {1, 2, …, q}, each value being used once, and that for the vertices should be {0, 1, …, p − 1}.

A graph G is said to be edge-graceful if it admits an edge-graceful labeling.

== Examples ==
=== Cycles ===
An edge-graceful labeling of C_{5}

Consider the cycle with three vertices, C_{3}. This is simply a triangle. One can label the edges 1, 2, and 3, and check directly that, along with the induced labeling on the vertices, this gives an edge-graceful labeling. Similar to paths, C_{m} is edge-graceful when m is odd and not when m is even.

=== Paths ===
Consider a path with two vertices, P_{2}. Here the only possibility is to label the only edge in the graph 1. The induced labeling on the two vertices are both 1. So P_{2} is not edge-graceful.

Appending an edge and a vertex to P_{2} gives P_{3}, the path with three vertices. Denote the vertices by v_{1}, v_{2}, and v_{3}. Label the two edges in the following way: the edge (v_{1}, v_{2}) is labeled 1 and (v_{2}, v_{3}) labeled 2. The induced labelings on v_{1}, v_{2}, and v_{3} are then 1, 0, and 2 respectively. This is an edge-graceful labeling and so P_{3} is edge-graceful.

Similarly, one can check that P_{4} is not edge-graceful.

In general, P_{m} is edge-graceful when m is odd and not edge-graceful when it is even. This follows from a necessary condition for edge-gracefulness.

== A necessary condition ==
Lo gave a necessary condition for a graph with q edges and p vertices to be edge-graceful:q(q + 1) must be congruent to (p(p − 1))/2 mod p. In symbols:

$$q(q+1) \equiv \frac{p(p-1)}{2} \mod p.$$

This is referred to as Lo's condition in the literature. This follows from the fact that the sum of the labels of the vertices is twice the sum of the edges, modulo p. This is useful for disproving a graph is edge-graceful. For instance, one can apply this directly to the path and cycle examples given above.

== Further selected results ==
- The Petersen graph is not edge-graceful.
- The star graph $S_m$ (a central node and m legs of length 1) is edge-graceful when m is even and not when m is odd.
- The friendship graph $F_m$ is edge-graceful when m is odd and not when it is even.
- Regular trees, $T_{m,n}$ (depth n with each non-leaf node emitting m new vertices) are edge-graceful when m is even for any value n but not edge-graceful whenever m is odd.
- The complete graph on n vertices, $K_n$, is edge-graceful unless n is singly even, $n=2\mod 4$.
- The ladder graph is never edge-graceful.
