= Butterfly graph =

Planar graph with 5 nodes and 6 edges

- Vertices: 5
- Edges: 6
- Radius: 1
- Diameter: 2
- Girth: 3
- Automorphisms: 8 (D_{4})
- Chromatic number: 3
- Chromatic index: 4
- Properties: Planar; Unit distance Eulerian; Not graceful

In the mathematical field of graph theory, the butterfly graph (also called the bowtie graph and the hourglass graph) is a planar, undirected graph with 5 vertices and 6 edges. It can be constructed by joining 2 copies of the cycle graph C_{3} with a common vertex and is therefore isomorphic to the friendship graph F_{2}.

The butterfly graph has diameter 2 and girth 3, radius 1, chromatic number 3, chromatic index 4 and is both Eulerian and a penny graph (this implies that it is unit distance and planar). It is also a 1-vertex-connected graph and a 2-edge-connected graph.

There are only three non-graceful simple graphs with five vertices. One of them is the butterfly graph. The two others are cycle graph C_{5} and the complete graph K_{5}.

== Bowtie-free graphs ==
A graph is bowtie-free if it has no butterfly as an induced subgraph. The triangle-free graphs are bowtie-free graphs, since every butterfly contains a triangle.

In a k-vertex-connected graph, an edge is said to be k-contractible if the contraction of the edge results in a k-connected graph. Ando, Kaneko, Kawarabayashi and Yoshimoto proved that every k-vertex-connected bowtie-free graph has a k-contractible edge.

== Algebraic properties ==
The full automorphism group of the butterfly graph is a group of order 8 isomorphic to the dihedral group D_{4}, the group of symmetries of a square, including both rotations and reflections.

The characteristic polynomial of the butterfly graph is $-(x-1)(x+1)^2(x^2-x-4)$.
