= Moral graph =

In graph theory, a moral graph is used to find the equivalent undirected form of a directed acyclic graph. It is a key step of the junction tree algorithm, used in belief propagation on graphical models.

A directed acyclic graph

The corresponding moral graph, with newly added arcs shown in red

The moralized counterpart of a directed acyclic graph is formed by adding edges between all pairs of non-adjacent nodes that have a common child, and then making all edges in the graph undirected. Equivalently, a moral graph of a directed acyclic graph G is an undirected graph in which each node of the original G is now connected to its Markov blanket. The name stems from the fact that, in a moral graph, two nodes that have a common child are required to be married by sharing an edge.

Moralization may also be applied to mixed graphs, called in this context "chain graphs". In a chain graph, a connected component of the undirected subgraph is called a chain. Moralization adds an undirected edge between any two vertices that both have outgoing edges to the same chain, and then forgets the orientation of the directed edges of the graph.

== Weakly recursively simplicial ==
A graph is weakly recursively simplicial if it has a simplicial vertex and the subgraph after removing a simplicial vertex and some edges (possibly none) between its neighbours is weakly recursively simplicial. A graph is moral if and only if it is weakly recursively simplicial.

A chordal graph (a.k.a., recursive simplicial) is a special case of weakly recursively simplicial when no edge is removed during the elimination process. Therefore, a chordal graph is also moral. But a moral graph is not necessarily chordal.

== Recognising moral graphs ==
Unlike chordal graphs that can be recognised in polynomial time, Verma & Pearl (1993) proved that deciding whether or not a graph is moral is NP-complete.

== See also ==
- D-separation
- Tree decomposition
