= Mixed graph =

Graph with directed and undirected edges

In graph theory, a mixed graph G = (V, E, A) is a graph consisting of a set of vertices V, a set of (undirected) edges E, and a set of directed edges (or arcs) A.

== Definitions and notation ==
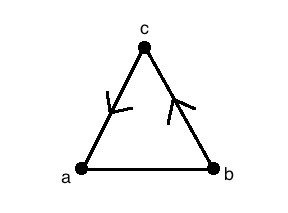
Example of a mixed graph

Consider adjacent vertices $u,v \in V$. A directed edge, called an arc, is an edge with an orientation and can be denoted as $\overrightarrow{uv}$ or $(u,v)$ (note that $u$ is the tail and $v$ is the head of the arc). Also, an undirected edge, or edge, is an edge with no orientation and can be denoted as $uv$ or $[u,v]$.

For the purpose of our example we will not be considering loops or multiple edges of mixed graphs.

A walk in a mixed graph is a sequence $v_0,c_1,v_1,c_2,v_2,\dots,c_k,v_k$ of vertices and edges/arcs such that for every index $i$, either $c_i=v_{i}v_{i+1}$ is an edge of the graph or $c_i=\overrightarrow{v_{i}v_{i+1}}$ is an arc of the graph. This walk is a path if it does not repeat any edges, arcs, or vertices, except possibly the first and last vertices. A walk is closed if its first and last vertices are the same, and a closed path is a cycle. A mixed graph is acyclic if it does not contain a cycle.

== Coloring ==
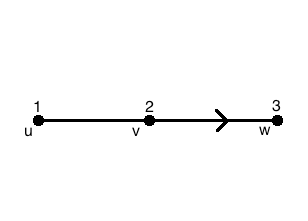
Example of a mixed graph

Mixed graph coloring can be thought of as labeling or an assignment of k different colors (where k is a positive integer) to the vertices of a mixed graph. Different colors must be assigned to vertices that are connected by an edge. The colors may be represented by the numbers from 1 to k, and for a directed arc, the tail of the arc must be colored by a smaller number than the head of the arc.

=== Example ===
For example, consider the figure to the right. Our available k-colors to color our mixed graph are {1, 2, 3}. Since u and v are connected by an edge, they must receive different colors or labelings (u and v are labelled 1 and 2, respectively). We also have an arc from v to w. Since orientation assigns an ordering, we must label the tail (v) with a smaller color (or integer from our set) than the head (w) of our arc.

=== Strong and weak coloring ===
A (strong) proper k-coloring of a mixed graph is a function c : V → [k] where [k] := {1, 2, …, k} such that c(u) ≠ c(v) if uv ∈ E and c(u) < c(v) if $\overrightarrow{uv} \in A$.

A weaker condition on our arcs can be applied and we can consider a weak proper k-coloring of a mixed graph to be a function c : V → [k] where [k] := {1, 2, …, k} such that c(u) ≠ c(v) if uv ∈ E and c(u) ≤ c(v) if $\overrightarrow{uv} \in A$. Referring back to our example, this means that we can label both the head and tail of (v,w) with the positive integer 2.

=== Counting ===
A coloring may or may not exist for a mixed graph. In order for a mixed graph to have a k-coloring, the graph cannot contain any directed cycles. If such a k-coloring exists, then we refer to the smallest k needed in order to properly color our graph as the chromatic number, denoted by χ(G). The number of proper k-colorings is a polynomial function of k called the chromatic polynomial of our graph G (by analogy with the chromatic polynomial of undirected graphs) and can be denoted by χ_{G(k)}.

=== Computing weak chromatic polynomials ===
The deletion–contraction method can be used to compute weak chromatic polynomials of mixed graphs. This method involves deleting (i.e., removing) an edge or arc and possibly joining the remaining vertices incident to that edge or arc to form one vertex. After deleting an edge e from a mixed graph G = (V, E, A) we obtain the mixed graph (V, E – e, A). We denote this deletion of the edge e by G – e. Similarly, by deleting an arc a from a mixed graph, we obtain (V, E, A – a) where we denote the deletion of a by G – a. Also, we denote the contraction of e and a by G/e and G/a, respectively. From Propositions given in Beck et al. we obtain the following equations to compute the chromatic polynomial of a mixed graph:

1. $\chi_G(k) = \chi_{G-e}(k) - \chi_{G/e}(k)$,
2. $\chi_G(k) = \chi_{G-a}(k) + \chi_{G/a}(k) - \chi_{G_a}(k)$.

== Applications ==
=== Scheduling problem ===
Mixed graphs may be used to model job shop scheduling problems in which a collection of tasks is to be performed, subject to certain timing constraints. In this sort of problem, undirected edges may be used to model a constraint that two tasks are incompatible (they cannot be performed simultaneously). Directed edges may be used to model precedence constraints, in which one task must be performed before another. A graph defined in this way from a scheduling problem is called a disjunctive graph. The mixed graph coloring problem can be used to find a schedule of minimum length for performing all the tasks.

=== Bayesian inference ===
Mixed graphs are also used as graphical models for Bayesian inference. In this context, an acyclic mixed graph (one with no cycles of directed edges) is also called a chain graph. The directed edges of these graphs are used to indicate a causal connection between two events, in which the outcome of the first event influences the probability of the second event. Undirected edges, instead, indicate a non-causal correlation between two events. A connected component of the undirected subgraph of a chain graph is called a chain. A chain graph may be transformed into an undirected graph by constructing its moral graph, an undirected graph formed from the chain graph by adding undirected edges between pairs of vertices that have outgoing edges to the same chain, and then forgetting the orientations of the directed edges.

=== Street network ===
A system of streets or roads may be represented by interconnecting mixed edges and nodes, where directed edges represent one-way streets and undirected edges represent two-way streets.
