= Rudolf Halin =

German mathematician

Rudolf Halin (February 3, 1934 – November 14, 2014) was a German graph theorist, known for defining the ends of infinite graphs, for Halin's grid theorem, for extending Menger's theorem to infinite graphs, and for his early research on treewidth and tree decomposition. He is also the namesake of Halin graphs, a class of planar graphs constructed from trees by adding a cycle through the leaves of the given tree; earlier researchers had studied the subclass of cubic Halin graphs but Halin was the first to study this class of graphs in full generality.

== Life ==
Halin was born on February 3, 1934, in Uerdingen. He earned his doctorate from the University of Cologne in 1962, under the supervision of Klaus Wagner and Karl Dörge, after which he joined the faculty of the University of Hamburg. He died on November 14, 2014, in Mölln, Schleswig-Holstein.

== Recognition ==
In February 1994, a colloquium was held at the University of Hamburg in honor of Halin's 60th birthday. In 2017, a special issue of the journal Abhandlungen aus dem Mathematischen Seminar der Universität Hamburg was published in his memory.

== Selected publications ==
=== Research papers ===
- Halin, R. (1964), "Über unendliche Wege in Graphen", Mathematische Annalen, 157 (2): 125–137, doi:10.1007/bf01362670, hdl:10338.dmlcz/102294, MR 0170340, S2CID 122125458.
- Halin, R. (1965), "Über die Maximalzahl fremder unendlicher Wege in Graphen", Mathematische Nachrichten, 30 (1–2): 63–85, doi:10.1002/mana.19650300106, MR 0190031.
- Halin, R. (1971), "Studies on minimally n-connected graphs", Combinatorial Mathematics and its Applications (Proc. Conf., Oxford, 1969), London: Academic Press, pp. 129–136, MR 0278980.
- Halin, R. (1974), "A note on Menger's theorem for infinite locally finite graphs", Abhandlungen aus dem Mathematischen Seminar der Universität Hamburg, 40: 111–114, doi:10.1007/BF02993589, MR 0335355, S2CID 120915644.
- Halin, R. (1976), "S-functions for graphs", Journal of Geometry, 8 (1–2): 171–186, doi:10.1007/BF01917434, MR 0444522, S2CID 120256194.

=== Textbooks ===
- Halin, R., Graphentheorie. Vols. I and II published in 1980 and 1981 respectively by Wissenschaftliche Buchgesellschaft. Combined 2nd ed. published in 1989 by Wissenschaftliche Buchgesellschaft.
