= Lattice graph =

Graph whose embedding in a Euclidean space forms a regular tiling

Square grid graph

Triangular grid graph

In graph theory, a lattice graph, mesh graph, or grid graph is a graph whose drawing, embedded in some Euclidean space $\mathbb{R}^n$, forms a regular tiling. This implies that the group of bijective transformations that send the graph to itself is a lattice in the group-theoretical sense.

Typically, no clear distinction is made between such a graph in the more abstract sense of graph theory, and its drawing in space (often the plane or 3D space). This type of graph may more shortly be called just a lattice, mesh, or grid. Moreover, these terms are also commonly used for a finite section of the infinite graph, as in "an 8 × 8 square grid".

The term lattice graph has also been given in the literature to various other kinds of graphs with some regular structure, such as the Cartesian product of a number of complete graphs.

== Square grid graph ==
A common type of lattice graph (known under different names, such as grid graph or square grid graph) is the graph whose vertices correspond to the points in the plane with integer coordinates, x-coordinates being in the range 1, ..., n, y-coordinates being in the range 1, ..., m, and two vertices being connected by an edge whenever the corresponding points are at distance one. In other words, it is the unit distance graph for the integer points in a rectangle with sides parallel to the axes.

=== Properties ===
A square grid graph is a Cartesian product of graphs, namely, of two path graphs with n − 1 and m − 1 edges. Since a path graph is a median graph, the latter fact implies that the square grid graph is also a median graph. All square grid graphs are bipartite, which is easily verified by the fact that one can color the vertices in a checkerboard fashion.

A path graph is a grid graph on the $1 \times n$ grid. A $2 \times 2$ grid graph is a 4-cycle.

Every planar graph H is a minor of the h × h grid, where $h = 2|V(H)| + 4|E(H)|$.

Grid graphs are fundamental objects in the theory of graph minors because of the grid exclusion theorem. They play a major role in bidimensionality theory.

== Other kinds ==
A triangular grid graph is a graph that corresponds to a triangular grid.

A Hanan grid graph for a finite set of points in the plane is produced by the grid obtained by intersections of all vertical and horizontal lines through each point of the set.

The rook's graph (the graph that represents all legal moves of the rook chess piece on a chessboard) is also sometimes called the lattice graph, although this graph is different from the lattice graph described here because all points in one row or column are adjacent. The valid moves of the fairy chess piece the wazir form a square lattice graph.

== See also ==
- Lattice path
- Pick's theorem
- Integer triangles in a 2D lattice
- Regular graph
