= Patrick Michael Grundy =

English mathematician and statistician

- Born: November 16, 1917; Yarmouth, Isle of Wight
- Died: November 4, 1959 (aged 41)
- Education: Malvern College (1935); Clare College, Cambridge (1939); University of Cambridge (PhD, 1945)
- Known for: Sprague–Grundy theorem Grundy number
- Spouse: Hillary Taylor
- Mother: C. V. Grundy
- Scientific career
- Fields: mathematics
- Institutions: University College of Hull; Rothamsted Experimental Station; National Institute for Educational Research; University of Oxford

Patrick Michael Grundy (16 November 1917, Yarmouth, Isle of Wight – 4 November 1959) was an English mathematician and statistician. He was one of the eponymous co-discoverers of the Sprague–Grundy function and its application to the analysis of a wide class of combinatorial games.

== Biography ==
Grundy received his secondary education from Malvern College, to which he had obtained a Major Scholarship in 1931, and from which he graduated in 1935. While there, he demonstrated his aptitude for mathematics by winning three prizes in that subject. After leaving school he entered Clare College, Cambridge, on a Foundation Scholarship, where he read for the Mathematical Tripos from 1936 to 1939, earning first class honours in Part II and a distinction in Part III.

The work for which he is best known appeared in his first paper, Mathematics and Games, first published in the Cambridge University Mathematical Society's magazine, Eureka in 1939, and reprinted by the same magazine in 1964. The main results of this paper were discovered independently by Grundy and by Roland Sprague, and had already been published by the latter in 1935. The key idea is that of a function that assigns a non-negative integer to each position of a class of combinatorial games, now called impartial games, and which greatly assists in the identification of winning and losing positions, and of the winning moves from the former. The number assigned to a position by this function is called its Grundy value (or Grundy number), and the function itself is called the Sprague–Grundy function, in honour of its co-discoverers. The procedures developed by Sprague and Grundy for using their function to analyse impartial games are collectively called Sprague–Grundy theory, and at least two different theorems concerning these procedures have been called Sprague–Grundy theorems. The maximum number of colors used by a greedy coloring algorithm is called the Grundy number, also after this work on games, as its definition has some formal similarities with the Sprague–Grundy theory.

In 1939 Grundy began research in algebraic geometry as a research student at the University of Cambridge, eventually specialising in the theory of ideals. In 1941 he won a Smith's Prize for an essay entitled On the theory of R-modules, and his first research paper in the area, A generalisation of additive ideal theory, was published in the following year. In 1943 he was appointed to an assistant lectureship at the University College of Hull, which he left in 1944. He was awarded a Ph.D. from the University of Cambridge in 1945.

Shortly after the end of World War II, Grundy moved away from the field of algebra to take up work in statistics. In 1947 he began formal training in the latter discipline at the Rothamsted Experimental Station under a Ministry of Agriculture scholarship, graduating in 1949, when he then joined the permanent staff of the former organisation as an Experimental Officer. In 1951 he was promoted to Senior Experimental Officer. During his time at Rothamsted he performed most of his published statistical research, which included investigations of problems in the design and analysis of experiments, sampling, composition of animal populations, and fitting truncated distributions.

From 1954 to 1958 Grundy worked as a statistician at the National Institute for Educational Research. During this period, he collaborated with Michael Healy and D.H. Rees to extend Frank Yates's work on cost–benefit analysis of experimentation. The results of this collaboration were reported in an influential paper, Economic choice of the amount of experimentation, published in series B of the Journal of the Royal Statistical Society in 1956. In 1958 Grundy moved to a position in the Biometry Unit at Oxford. However, he retired from this position after only one term, due to ill health.

Early in 1959 Grundy married Hilary Taylor, a former colleague from the National Institute of Educational Research. Although his health then greatly improved throughout 1959, he was unfortunately killed in an accident in November of that year.

== List of Grundy's papers ==
With the exception of the final item, this list is taken from Smith's obituary (1960). The first item is missing from Goddard's (1960) list, which is otherwise the same as Smith's.

1. "Mathematics and games", Eureka, 2: 6–8, 1939
2. Grundy, P. M. (1942), "A generalisation of additive ideal theory", Mathematical Proceedings of the Cambridge Philosophical Society, 38 (3): 241–79, Bibcode:1942PCPS...38..241G, doi:10.1017/s0305004100021940, S2CID 120777795
3. Scorer, R. S.; Grundy, P. M.; Smith, C. A. B. (1944), "Some binary games", Mathematical Gazette, 28 (280): 96–103, doi:10.2307/3606393, JSTOR 3606393, S2CID 125099183 (with R.S. Scorer and C.A.B Smith)
4. Grundy, P. M. (1947), "On integrally dependent Integral domains", Philosophical Transactions of the Royal Society of London, A, 240 (819): 295–326, Bibcode:1947RSPTA.240..295G, doi:10.1098/rsta.1947.0004
5. "Restricted randomization and quasi-latin squares", Journal of the Royal Statistical Society, Series B, 12: 286–91, 1950 (with M.J.R. Healy)
6. Grundy, P. M. (1950), "The estimation of error in rectangular lattices", Biometrics, 6 (1): 25–33, doi:10.2307/3001421, JSTOR 3001421
7. "A general technique for the analysis of experiments with incorrectly treated plots", Journal of the Royal Statistical Society, Series B, 13: 272–83, 1951
8. Grundy, P. M. (1951), "The expected frequencies in a sample of an animal population in which the abundances of species are log-normally distributed (Part I)", Biometrika, 38 (3–4): 427–34, doi:10.1093/biomet/38.3-4.427
9. Grundy, P. M. (1952), "The fitting of grouped truncated and grouped censored distributions", Biometrika, 39 (3/4): 252–9, doi:10.2307/2334022, JSTOR 2334022
10. "Selection without replacement from within strata with probability proportional to size", Journal of the Royal Statistical Society, Series B, 15: 253–61, 1953 (with F. Yates)
11. Leech, F. B.; Grundy, P. M. (1953), "A nomogram for assays in randomized blocks", British Journal of Pharmacology, 8 (3): 281–5, doi:10.1111/j.1476-5381.1953.tb00795.x, PMC 1509275, PMID 13093947 (with F. Leech)
12. Grundy, P. M.; Rees, D. H.; Healy, M. J. R. (1954), "Decision between two alternatives—How many experiments?", Biometrics, 10 (3): 317–23, doi:10.2307/3001588, JSTOR 3001588 (with D.H. Rees and M.J.R. Healy)
13. "A method of sampling with probability exactly proportional to size", Journal of the Royal Statistical Society, Series B, 16: 236–8, 1954
14. "Economic choice of the amount of experimentation", Journal of the Royal Statistical Society, Series B, 18: 32–49, 1956 (with D.H. Rees and M.J.R. Healy)
15. "Fiducial distributions and prior distributions: an example in which the former cannot be associated with the latter", Journal of the Royal Statistical Society, Series B, 18: 217–21, 1956
16. Grundy, P. M.; Smith, C. A. B. (1956), "Disjunctive games with the last player losing", Mathematical Proceedings of the Cambridge Philosophical Society, 52 (3): 527–33, Bibcode:1956PCPS...52..527G, doi:10.1017/s0305004100031510, S2CID 122928717 (with C.A.B. Smith)
17. "Mathematics and games", Eureka, 27: 9–11, 1964 [1939], archived from the original on 27 September 2007. Reprint of Grundy (1939).
