= Exact =

Exact may refer to:

- Exaction, a concept in real property law
- Ex'Act, 2016 studio album by Exo
- Schooner Exact, the ship which carried the founders of Seattle

== Companies ==
- Exact (company), a Dutch software company
- Exact Change, an American independent book publishing company
- Exact Editions, a content management platform

== Mathematics ==
- Exact differentials, in multivariate calculus
- Exact algorithms, in computer science and operations research
- Exact colorings, in graph theory
- Exact couples, a general source of spectral sequences
- Exact sequences, in homological algebra
- Exact functor, a function which preserves exact sequences

== See also ==
- Exactor (disambiguation)
- XACT (disambiguation)
- EXACTO, a sniper rifle
