= Dowling geometry =

Matroid associated with a group

In combinatorial mathematics, a Dowling geometry, named after Thomas A. Dowling, is a matroid associated with a group. There is a Dowling geometry of each rank for each group. If the rank is at least 3, the Dowling geometry uniquely determines the group. Dowling geometries have a role in matroid theory as universal objects (Kahn and Kung, 1982); in that respect they are analogous to projective geometries, but based on groups instead of fields.

A Dowling lattice is the geometric lattice of flats associated with a Dowling geometry. The lattice and the geometry are mathematically equivalent: knowing either one determines the other. Dowling lattices, and by implication Dowling geometries, were introduced by Dowling (1973a,b).

A Dowling lattice or geometry of rank n of a group G is often denoted by Q_{n}(G).

== The original definitions ==
In his first paper (1973a) Dowling defined the rank-n Dowling lattice of the multiplicative group of a finite field F. It is the set of all those subspaces of the vector space F^{n} that are generated by subsets of the set E that consists of vectors with at most two nonzero coordinates. The corresponding Dowling geometry is the set of 1-dimensional vector subspaces generated by the elements of E.

In his second paper (1973b) Dowling gave an intrinsic definition of the rank-n Dowling lattice of any finite group G. Let S be the set {1,...,n}. A G-labelled set (T, α) is a set T together with a function α: T → G. Two G-labelled sets, (T, α) and (T, β), are equivalent if there is a group element, g, such that β = gα. An equivalence class is denoted [T, α]. A partial G-partition of S is a set γ = {[B_{1},α_{1}], ..., [B_{k},α_{k}]} of equivalence classes of G-labelled sets such that B_{1}, ..., B_{k} are nonempty subsets of S that are pairwise disjoint. (k may equal 0.) A partial G-partition γ is said to be ≤ another one, γ*, if

- every block of the second is a union of blocks of the first, and
- for each B_{i} contained in B*_{j}, α_{i} is equivalent to the restriction of α*_{j} to domain B_{i} .

This gives a partial ordering of the set of all partial G-partitions of S. The resulting partially ordered set is the Dowling lattice Q_{n}(G).

The definitions are valid even if F or G is infinite, though Dowling mentioned only finite fields and groups.

== Graphical definitions ==
A graphical definition was then given by Doubilet, Rota, and Stanley (1972). We give the slightly simpler (but essentially equivalent) graphical definition of Zaslavsky (1991), expressed in terms of gain graphs.

Take n vertices, and between each pair of vertices, v and w, take a set of |G| parallel edges labelled by each of the elements of the group G. The labels are oriented, in that, if the label in the direction from v to w is the group element g, then the label of the same edge in the opposite direction, from w to v, is g^{−1}. The label of an edge therefore depends on the direction of the edge; such labels are called gains. Also add to each vertex a loop whose gain is any value other than 1. (1 is the group identity element.) This gives a graph which is called GK_{n}^{o} (note the raised circle), called the full $G$-expansion of $K_n$. (A slightly different definition is needed for the trivial group; the added edges must be half edges.)

A cycle in the graph then has a gain. The cycle is a sequence of edges, e_{1}e_{2}···e_{k}. Suppose the gains of these edges, in a fixed direction around the cycle, are g_{1}, g_{2}, ..., g_{k}. Then the gain of the cycle is the product, g_{1}g_{2}···g_{k}. The value of this gain is not completely well defined, since it depends on the direction chosen for the cycle and on which is called the "first" edge of the cycle. What is independent of these choices is the answer to the following question: is the gain equal to 1 or not? If it equals 1 under one set of choices, then it is also equal to 1 under all sets of choices.

To define the Dowling geometry, we specify the circuits (minimal dependent sets). The circuits of the matroid are

- the cycles whose gain is 1,
- the pairs of cycles with both gains not equal to 1, and which intersect in a single vertex and nothing else, and
- the theta graphs in which none of the three cycles has gain equal to 1.

Thus, the Dowling geometry Q_{n}(G) is the frame matroid (or bias matroid) of the gain graph GK_{n}^{o} (the raised circle denotes the presence of loops). Other, equivalent definitions are described in the article on gain graphs.

== Characteristic polynomial ==
One reason for interest in Dowling lattices is that the characteristic polynomial is very simple. If L is the Dowling lattice of rank n of a finite group G having m elements, then

$$p_L(y) = (y-1)(y-m-1)\cdots(y-[n-1]m-1) ,$$

an exceptionally simple formula for any geometric lattice.

== Generalizations ==
There is also a Dowling geometry, of rank 3 only, associated with each quasigroup; see Dowling (1973b). This does not generalize in a straightforward way to higher ranks. There is a further generalization due to Zaslavsky (2012) that involves n-ary quasigroups.

A different generalization due to Zaslavsky (1991) is obtained from the full $G$-expansion of an arbitrary graph $\Gamma$. This gain graph has lattice obtained from the Dowling lattice by excluding all partial partitions such that the induced subgraph on some B_{i} is disconnected. The characteristic polynomial of this matroid is obtained from the chromatic polynomial $\chi_\Gamma(t)$ of $\Gamma$ by substituting $t = (y-1)/|G|$ and normalizing to a monic polynomial.
