= Exact coloring =

Graph coloring with one edge per color pair

Example of Exact Coloring with 7 colors and 14 vertices

In graph theory, an exact coloring is a (proper) vertex coloring in which every pair of colors appears on exactly one pair of adjacent vertices. That is, it is a partition of the vertices of the graph into disjoint independent sets such that, for each pair of distinct independent sets in the partition, there is exactly one edge with endpoints in each set.

== Complete graphs, detachments, and Euler tours ==
Exact coloring of the complete graph K_{6}

Every n-vertex complete graph K_{n} has an exact coloring with n colors, obtained by giving each vertex a distinct color. Every graph with an n-color exact coloring may be obtained as a detachment of a complete graph, a graph obtained from the complete graph by splitting each vertex into an independent set and reconnecting each edge incident to the vertex to exactly one of the members of the corresponding independent set.

When k is an odd number, A path or cycle with $\tbinom{k}{2}$ edges has an exact coloring, obtained by forming an exact coloring of the complete graph K_{k} and then finding an Euler tour of this complete graph. For instance, a path with three edges has a complete 3-coloring.

== Related types of coloring ==
Exact colorings are closely related to harmonious colorings (colorings in which each pair of colors appears at most once) and complete colorings (colorings in which each pair of colors appears at least once). Clearly, an exact coloring is a coloring that is both harmonious and complete. A graph G with n vertices and m edges has a harmonious k-coloring if and only if $m\le\tbinom{k}{2}$ and the graph formed from G by adding $\tbinom{k}{2}-m$ isolated edges has an exact coloring. A graph G with the same parameters has a complete k-coloring if and only if $m\ge\tbinom{k}{2}$ and there exists a subgraph H of G with an exact k-coloring in which each edge of G − H has endpoints of different colorings. The need for the condition on the edges of G − H is shown by the example of a four-vertex cycle, which has a subgraph with an exact 3-coloring (the three-edge path) but does not have a complete 3-coloring itself.

== Computational complexity ==
It is NP-complete to determine whether a given graph has an exact coloring, even in the case that the graph is a tree. However, the problem may be solved in polynomial time for trees of bounded degree.
