= Well-colored graph =

The graph of an octahedron is complete multipartite (K_{2,2,2}) and well-colored.

In graph theory, a subfield of mathematics, a well-colored graph is an undirected graph for which greedy coloring uses the same number of colors regardless of the order in which colors are chosen for its vertices. That is, for these graphs, the chromatic number (minimum number of colors) and Grundy number (maximum number of greedily-chosen colors) are equal.

== Examples ==
The well-colored graphs include the complete graphs and odd-length cycle graphs (the graphs that form the exceptional cases to Brooks' theorem) as well as the complete bipartite graphs and complete multipartite graphs.

The simplest example of a graph that is not well-colored is a four-vertex path. Coloring the vertices in path order uses two colors, the optimum for this graph. However, coloring the ends of the path first (using the same color for each end) causes the greedy coloring algorithm to use three colors for this graph. Because there exists a non-optimal vertex ordering, the path is not well-colored.

== Complexity ==
A graph is well-colored if and only if does not have two vertex orderings for which the greedy coloring algorithm produces different numbers of colors. Therefore, recognizing non-well-colored graphs can be performed within the complexity class NP. On the other hand, a graph $G$ has Grundy number $k$ or more if and only if the graph obtained from $G$ by adding a $(k-1)$-vertex clique is not well-colored. Therefore, by a reduction from the Grundy number problem, it is NP-complete to test whether these two orderings exist. It follows that it is co-NP-complete to test whether a given graph is well-colored.

== Related properties ==
A graph is hereditarily well-colored if every induced subgraph is well-colored. The hereditarily well-colored graphs are exactly the cographs, the graphs that do not have a four-vertex path as an induced subgraph.
