= Biased graph =

Graph with a list of distinguished cycles

In mathematics, a biased graph is a graph with a list of distinguished circles (edge sets of simple cycles), such that if two circles in the list are contained in a theta graph, then the third circle of the theta graph is also in the list. A biased graph is a generalization of the combinatorial essentials of a gain graph and in particular of a signed graph.

Formally, a biased graph Ω is a pair (G, B) where G is a graph and B is a linear class of circles in G. (A "linear class" is a class of circles that satisfies the theta-graph property mentioned above.)

A subgraph or edge set whose circles are all in B (and which contains no half-edges) is called balanced. For instance, a circle belonging to B is balanced and one that does not belong to B is unbalanced.

Biased graphs are interesting mostly because of their matroids, but also because of their connection with multiary quasigroups. See below.

== Technical notes ==
A biased graph may have half-edges (one endpoint) and loose edges (no endpoints). The edges with two endpoints are of two kinds: a link has two distinct endpoints, while a loop has two coinciding endpoints.

Linear classes of circles are a special case of linear subclasses of circuits in a matroid.

== Examples ==
- If every circle belongs to B, and there are no half-edges, Ω is balanced. A balanced biased graph is (for most purposes) essentially the same as an ordinary graph.
- If B is empty, Ω is called contrabalanced. Contrabalanced biased graphs are related to bicircular matroids.
- If B consists of the circles of even length, Ω is called antibalanced and is the biased graph obtained from an all-negative signed graph.
- The linear class B is additive, that is, closed under repeated symmetric difference (when the result is a circle), if and only if B is the class of positive circles of a signed graph.
- Ω may have underlying graph that is a cycle of length n ≥ 3 with all edges doubled. Call this a biased 2C_{n} . Such biased graphs in which no digon (circle of length 2) is balanced lead to spikes and swirls (see Matroids, below).
- Some kinds of biased graph are obtained from gain graphs or are generalizations of special kinds of gain graph. The latter include biased expansion graphs, which generalize group expansion graphs.

== Minors ==
A minor of a biased graph Ω = (G, B) is the result of any sequence of taking subgraphs and contracting edge sets. For biased graphs, as for graphs, it suffices to take a subgraph (which may be the whole graph) and then contract an edge set (which may be the empty set).

A subgraph of Ω consists of a subgraph H of the underlying graph G, with balanced circle class consisting of those balanced circles that are in H. The deletion of an edge set S, written Ω − S, is the subgraph with all vertices and all edges except those of S.

Contraction of Ω is relatively complicated. To contract one edge e, the procedure depends on the kind of edge e is. If e is a link, contract it in G. A circle C in the contraction G/e is balanced if either C or $C \cup e$ is a balanced circle of G. If e is a balanced loop or a loose edge, it is simply deleted. If it is an unbalanced loop or a half-edge, it and its vertex v are deleted; each other edge with v as an endpoint loses that endpoint, so a link with v as one endpoint becomes a half-edge at its other endpoint, while a loop or half-edge at v becomes a loose edge.

In the contraction Ω/S by an arbitrary edge set S, the edge set is E − S. (We let G = (V, E).) The vertex set is the class of vertex sets of balanced components of the subgraph (V, S) of Ω. That is, if (V, S) has balanced components with vertex sets V_{1}, ..., V_{k}, then Ω/S has k vertices V_{1}, ..., V_{k} . An edge e of Ω, not in S, becomes an edge of Ω/S and each endpoint v_{i} of e in Ω that belongs to some V_{i} becomes the endpoint V_{i} of e in Ω/S; thus, an endpoint of e that is not in a balanced component of (V, S) disappears. An edge with all endpoints in unbalanced components of (V, S) becomes a loose edge in the contraction. An edge with only one endpoint in a balanced component of (V, S) becomes a half-edge. An edge with two endpoints that belong to different balanced components becomes a link, and an edge with two endpoints that belong to the same balanced component becomes a loop.

== Matroids ==
There are two kinds of matroid associated with a biased graph, both of which generalize the cycle matroid of a graph (Zaslavsky, 1991).

=== The frame matroid ===
The frame matroid (sometimes called bias matroid) of a biased graph, M(Ω), (Zaslavsky, 1989) has for its ground set the edge set E. An edge set is independent if each component contains either no circles or just one circle, which is unbalanced. (In matroid theory a half-edge acts like an unbalanced loop and a loose edge acts like a balanced loop.) M(Ω) is a frame matroid in the abstract sense, meaning that it is a submatroid of a matroid in which, for at least one basis, the set of lines generated by pairs of basis elements covers the whole matroid. Conversely, every abstract frame matroid is the frame matroid of some biased graph.

The circuits of the matroid are called frame circuits or bias circuits. There are four kinds. One is a balanced circle. Two other kinds are a pair of unbalanced circles together with a connecting simple path, such that the two circles are either disjoint (then the connecting path has one end in common with each circle and is otherwise disjoint from both) or share just a single common vertex (in this case the connecting path is that single vertex). The fourth kind of circuit is a theta graph in which every circle is unbalanced.

The rank of an edge set S is n − b, where n is the number of vertices of G and b is the number of balanced components of S, counting isolated vertices as balanced components.

Minors of the frame matroid agree with minors of the biased graph; that is, M(Ω−S) = M(Ω)−S and M(Ω/S) = M(Ω)/S.

Frame matroids generalize the Dowling geometries associated with a group (Dowling, 1973). The frame matroid of a biased 2C_{n} (see Examples, above) which has no balanced digons is called a swirl. It is important in matroid structure theory.

=== The lift matroid ===
The extended lift matroid L_{0}(Ω) has for its ground set the set E_{0}, which is the union of E with an extra point e_{0}. The lift matroid L(Ω) is the extended lift matroid restricted to E. The extra point acts exactly like an unbalanced loop or a half-edge, so we describe only the lift matroid.

An edge set is independent if it contains either no circles or just one circle, which is unbalanced.

A circuit is a balanced circle, a pair of unbalanced circles that are either disjoint or have just a common vertex, or a theta graph whose circles are all unbalanced.

The rank of an edge set S is n − c + ε, where c is the number of components of S, counting isolated vertices, and ε is 0 if S is balanced and 1 if it is not.

Minors of the lift and extended lift matroids agree in part with minors of the biased graph. Deletions agree: L(Ω−S) = L(Ω)−S. Contractions agree only for balanced edge sets: M(Ω/S) = M(Ω)/S if S is balanced, but not if it is unbalanced. If S is unbalanced, M(Ω/S) = M(G)/S = M(G/S) where M of a graph denotes the ordinary graphic matroid.

The lift matroid of a 2C_{n} (see Examples, above) which has no balanced digons is called a spike. Spikes are important in matroid structure theory.

== Multiary quasigroups ==
Just as a group expansion of a complete graph K_{n} encodes the group (see Dowling geometry), its combinatorial analog expanding a simple cycle of length n + 1 encodes an n-ary (multiary) quasigroup. It is possible to prove theorems about multiary quasigroups by means of biased graphs (Zaslavsky 2012).
