= T-coloring =

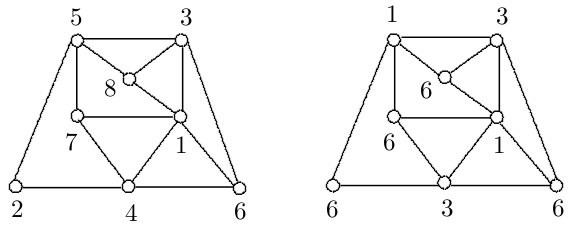
Two T-colorings of a graph for T = {0, 1, 4}

In graph theory, a T-Coloring of a graph $G = (V, E)$, given the set T of nonnegative integers containing 0, is a function $c: V(G) \to \N$ that maps each vertex to a positive integer (color) such that if u and w are adjacent then $|c(u) - c(w)| \notin T$. In simple words, the absolute value of the difference between two colors of adjacent vertices must not belong to fixed set T. The concept was introduced by William K. Hale. If T = {0} it reduces to common vertex coloring.

The T-chromatic number, $\chi_{T}(G),$ is the minimum number of colors that can be used in a T-coloring of G.

The complementary coloring of T-coloring c, denoted $\overline{c}$ is defined for each vertex v of G by

$$\overline{c}(v) = s+1-c(v)$$

where s is the largest color assigned to a vertex of G by the c function.

== Relation to chromatic number ==
Proposition. $\chi_{T}(G)=\chi(G)$.

Proof. Every T-coloring of G is also a vertex coloring of G, so $\chi_{T}(G)\geq \chi(G).$ Suppose that $\chi(G)=k$ and $r=\max(T).$ Given a common vertex k-coloring function $c: V(G) \to \N$ using the colors $\{1, \ldots,k\}.$ We define $d: V(G) \to \N$ as

$$d(v)=(r+1)c(v)$$

For every two adjacent vertices u and w of G,

$$|d(u) - d(w)| =| (r+1)c(u) - (r+1)c(w)| =(r+1) | c(u)-c(w)| \geq r +1$$

so $|d(u) - d(w)| \notin T.$ Therefore d is a T-coloring of G. Since d uses k colors, $\chi_{T}(G)\leq k =\chi(G).$ Consequently, $\chi_{T}(G)=\chi(G).$

== T-span ==
The span of a T-coloring c of G is defined as

$$sp_T(c) = \max_{u,w \in V(G)} |c(u) -c(w)|.$$

The T-span is defined as:

$sp_T(G) = \min_c sp_T(c).$

Some bounds of the T-span are given below:

- For every k-chromatic graph G with clique of size $\omega$ and every finite set T of nonnegative integers containing 0, $sp_T(K_{\omega}) \le sp_T(G) \le sp_T(K_k).$
- For every graph G and every finite set T of nonnegative integers containing 0 whose largest element is r, $sp_T(G)\le (\chi(G)-1)(r+1).$
- For every graph G and every finite set T of nonnegative integers containing 0 whose cardinality is t, $sp_T(G)\le (\chi(G)-1)t.$

== See also ==
- Graph coloring
