= L(h, k)-coloring =

Type of graph coloring

In graph theory, a L(h, k)-labelling, L(h, k)-coloring or sometimes L(p, q)-coloring is a (proper) vertex coloring in which every pair of adjacent vertices has color numbers that differ by at least h, and any nodes connected by a 2 length path have their colors differ by at least k. The parameters h, k are understood to be non-negative integers.

The problem originated from a channel assignment problem in radio networks. The span of an L(h, k)-labelling, ρ_{h,k}(G) is the difference between the largest and the smallest assigned frequency. The goal of the L(h, k)-labelling problem is usually to find a labelling with minimum span. For a given graph, the minimum span over all possible labelling functions is the λ_{h,k}-number of G, denoted by λ_{h,k}(G).

When h = 1 and k = 0, it is the usual (proper) vertex coloring.

There is a very large number of articles concerning L(h, k)-labelling, with different h and k parameters and different classes of graphs.

In some variants, the goal is to minimize the number of used colors (the order).

== See also ==
- L(2, 1)-coloring
