= Exactor =

Exactor may refer to:

- Someone who practices extortion
- Tax collector
- Exactor (betting) - a type of bet in parimutuel horse betting
- British Royal Artillery designation for the Spike NLOS guided missile

== See also ==
- Exact (disambiguation)
