= Norman J. Pullman =

American mathematician

- Education: Syracuse University
- Known for: Number theory Linear algebra Tournament theory Matrix theory
- Scientific career
- Fields: Mathematics
- Workplaces: McGill University
- Thesis: On the number of positive entries in the powers of a non-negative matrix (1962)

Norman J. Pullman (March 31, 1931 – May 28, 1999) was a mathematician, professor of mathematics, and Doctor of Mathematics, who specialized in number theory, matrix theory, linear algebra, and theory of tournaments.

== Career ==
He earned an M.A. degree in mathematics from Harvard University, and in 1962, he was awarded the Doctorate degree of Mathematics from Syracuse University.

From 1962 to 1965, he was professor of Mathematics at McGill University. And in 1965 he was awarded a postdoctoral fellowship at University of Alberta.

In 1965 he started to work at the faculty of Queen's University, and held a professorship position since 1971.

He lectured in professional meetings for the American Mathematical Society and the Australian Mathematical Society.

He was a visiting scholar for Curtin University of Technology in a great many occasions, and had a professional association with the institution.

During his career, he supervised mathematicians like Dominique de Caen, Rolf S. Rees, and Bill Jackson, among others.

His research included contributions in matrix theory, linear algebra, and theory of tournaments.
