= Interval coloring =

In graph theory, the interval chromatic number $\chi_<(H)$ of an ordered graph $H$ is the minimum number of intervals the (linearly ordered) vertex set of $H$ can be partitioned into so that no two vertices belonging to the same interval are adjacent in $H$.

== Definition and basic properties ==
An ordered graph is a graph $G$ together with a specified linear ordering on its vertex set $V(G)$. In an ordered graph $H$, an interval coloring is a partition of $V(H)$ into independent sets of consecutive vertices (called intervals or parts). The interval chromatic number $\chi_<(H)$ is the minimum number of parts in any interval coloring of $H$.

Since the parts of an interval coloring are independent sets:

$$\chi_<(H) \geq \chi(H)$$,

where $\chi(H)$ is the ordinary chromatic number.

An ordered graph is called interval k-chromatic (or k-ichromatic) if $\chi_<(H) = k$.

== Computational complexity ==
It is of particular interest that the interval chromatic number is easily computable. By a simple greedy algorithm, one can efficiently find an optimal partition of the vertex set of $H$ into $\chi_<(H)$ independent intervals. This is in sharp contrast with computing the usual chromatic number of a graph, where even finding an approximation is an NP hard task.

For a given graph $H$ and its isomorphic graphs, the chromatic number remains the same, but the interval chromatic number may differ depending on the ordering of the vertex set.

== Extremal theory ==
Pach and Tardos proved a fundamental theorem relating the interval chromatic number to extremal graph theory:

For any ordered graph $H$, the maximum number of edges that an $H$-free ordered graph with $n$ vertices can have is:

$$ex_<(n, H) = \left(1 - \frac{1}{\chi_<(H) - 1}\right)\binom{n}{2} + o(n^2)$$

This theorem naturally extends to families $\mathcal{H}$ of forbidden ordered subgraphs with:

$$\chi_<(\mathcal{H}) := \min\{\chi_<(H) \mid H \in \mathcal{H}\}$$

== Relation to forbidden patterns ==
The interval chromatic number plays a crucial role in forbidden pattern problems for ordered graphs and zero-one matrices. For a 2-ichromatic ordered graph, the extremal problem becomes particularly interesting, as the quadratic term vanishes in the extremal function formula. These can be represented by zero-one matrices where the vertices are enumerated as $v_1 < v_2 < \ldots < v_n < v_{n+1} < \ldots < v_{n+m}$ such that every edge connects some $v_i$ with $i \leq n$ to some $v_j$ with $j > n$.

The forbidden pattern problems connect to several problems in discrete geometry, including the unit distance graph problem, the planar segment-center problem, and the finding of Davenport–Schinzel sequences.

== See also ==
- Ordered graph
- Graph coloring
- Ramsey theory
- Extremal graph theory
