= XACT =

XACT can refer to:

- Cross-platform Audio Creation Tool, an audio system developed by Microsoft
- xACT (X Audio Compression Toolkit), an application that encodes and decodes FLAC, SHN, Monkey’s Audio, TTA, Wavpack, and Apple Lossless files.
- IP-XACT, an XML-based standard covering electronic components
- Xact Radio, a former brand used by broadcaster WNTY in the United States

== See also ==
- Extortion
