= Harmonious coloring =

Vertex coloring where no two linked nodes have the same color pairing

Harmonious coloring of the complete 7-ary tree with 3 levels using 12 colors. The harmonious chromatic number of this graph is 12. Any fewer colors will result in a color pair appearing on more than one pair of adjacent vertices. Moreover, by Mitchem's Formula, χ_{H}(T_{7,3}) = ⌈(3/2)(7+1)⌉ = 12.

In graph theory, a harmonious coloring is a (proper) vertex coloring in which every pair of colors appears on at most one pair of adjacent vertices. It is the opposite of the complete coloring, which instead requires every color pairing to occur at least once. The harmonious chromatic number χ_{H}(G) of a graph G is the minimum number of colors needed for any harmonious coloring of G.

Every graph has a harmonious coloring, since it suffices to assign every vertex a distinct color; thus χ_{H}(G) ≤ |V(G)|. There trivially exist graphs G with χ_{H}(G) > χ(G) (where χ is the chromatic number); one example is any path of length > 2, which can be 2-colored but has no harmonious coloring with 2 colors.

Some properties of χ_{H}(G):

$$\chi_{H}(T_{k,3}) = \left\lceil\frac{3(k+1)}{2}\right\rceil,$$

where T_{k,3} is the complete k-ary tree with 3 levels. (Mitchem 1989)

Harmonious coloring was first proposed by Harary and Plantholt (1982). Still very little is known about it.

== See also ==
- Complete coloring
- Harmonious labeling
