= Colored matroid =

Abstract structure with colored elements

In mathematics, a colored matroid is a matroid whose elements are labeled from a set of colors, which can be any set that suits the purpose, for instance the set of the first n positive integers, or the sign set {+, −}.

The interest in colored matroids is through their invariants, especially the colored Tutte polynomial, which generalizes the Tutte polynomial of a signed graph of Kauffman (1989).

There has also been study of optimization problems on matroids where the objective function of the optimization depends on the set of colors chosen as part of a matroid basis.

== See also ==
- Bipartite matroid
- Rota's basis conjecture
