= Michael Healy (statistician) =

British statistician

- Born: 26 November 1923; Paignton, Devon
- Died: 17 July 2016 (aged 92)
- Citizenship: United Kingdom
- Education: Trinity College, Cambridge
- Awards: Guy Medal (Silver, 1979) (Gold, 1999)
- Scientific career
- Fields: Statistics
- Workplaces: Rothamsted Experimental Station; MRC Clinical Research Centre; London School of Hygiene and Tropical Medicine

Michael John Romer Healy (26 November 1923 – 17 July 2016) was a British statistician known for his contributions to statistical computing, auxology, laboratory statistics and quality control, and methods for analysing longitudinal data, among other areas. He was professor of medical statistics at the London School of Hygiene and Tropical Medicine from 1977 until his retirement. The Royal Statistical Society awarded him the Guy Medal in Silver in 1979 and Gold in 1999, and he also acted as chairman of its medical section. He was the author or co-author of three books and over 200 scientific papers.

He died on 17 July 2016 at the age of 92.

== Books ==
- Assessment of Skeletal Maturity and Prediction of Adult Height (TW2Method) (with J. M. Tanner, R. H. Whitehouse, W. A. Marshall and H. Goldstein), Academic Press, London, 1975 (2nd edn, 1983, additionally with N. Cameron). ISBN 978-0-7020-2511-2
- Matrices for Statistics, Oxford University Press, Oxford, 1986. ISBN 978-0-19-850702-4
- GLIM: an Introduction, Oxford University Press, Oxford, 1988. ISBN 978-0-19-852213-3
