= Dominique de Caen =

Canadian mathematician

- Born: May 11, 1956
- Died: June 25, 2002 (aged 46)
- Citizenship: Canada
- Education: McGill University; Queen's University; University of Toronto
- Known for: Graph theory Probability theory Information theory
- Scientific career
- Fields: Mathematics
- Workplaces: Queen's University
- Thesis: On Turán's Hypergraph Problem (1984)
- Doctoral advisor: Eric Mendelsohn

Dominique de Caen (May 11, 1956 – June 25, 2002) was a mathematician, Doctor of Mathematics, and professor of mathematics, who specialized in graph theory, probability theory, and information theory. He is renowned for his research on Turán's extremal problem for hypergraphs.

== Career ==
He studied mathematics at McGill University, where he earned a Bachelor of Science degree in 1977.

In 1979, he obtained a Master of Science degree from Queen's University with a thesis on Prime Boolean matrices.

In 1982, he earned the Doctorate of Mathematics degree from University of Toronto with a thesis entitled On Turán's Hypergraph Problem which was supervised by Eric Mendelsohn.

Most of his academic papers have been published in the journals Discrete Mathematics, Designs, Codes and Cryptography, the Journal of Combinatorial Theory, and the European Journal of Combinatorics, among others.

== Academic research ==
- Dominique De Caen; Dmitry Fon-der-flaass (2005). "Distance Regular Covers of Complete Graphs from Latin Squares". Designs, Codes and Cryptography. 34 (2–3): 149–153. doi:10.1007/s10623-004-4851-x. S2CID 32696776.
- Dominique De Caen; Edwin R. Van Dam (2001). "Fissioned Triangular Schemes via the Cross-ratio" (PDF). European Journal of Combinatorics. 22 (3): 297–301. doi:10.1006/eujc.2000.0467.
- D. De Caen (2001). "A Note on the Ranks of Set-Inclusion Matrices". The Electronic Journal of Combinatorics. 8 (1).
- Dominique De Caen; Zoltán Füredi (2000). "The Maximum Size of 3Uniform Hypergraphs Not Containing a Fano Plane". Journal of Combinatorial Theory. 78 (2): 274–276. doi:10.1006/jctb.1999.1938.
- D. De Caen (2000). "Large Equiangular Sets of Lines in Euclidean Space". The Electronic Journal of Combinatorics. 7. doi:10.37236/1533.
- Dominique De Caen; Edwin R. Van Dam (1999). "Association Schemes Related to Kasami Codes and Kerdock Sets" (PDF). Designs Codes Cryptography. 18 (1/3): 89–102. doi:10.1023/A:1008385102731. S2CID 6386298.
- Dominique De Caen; Edwin R. Van Dam; Edward Spence (1999). "A Nonregular Analogue of Conference Graphs". Journal of Combinatorial Theory. 88 (1): 194–204. doi:10.1006/jcta.1999.2983.
- Dominique De Caen; Edwin R. Van Dam (1999). "Fissions of Classical Self-Dual Association Schemes" (PDF). Journal of Combinatorial Theory. 88 (1): 167–175. doi:10.1006/jcta.1999.2970.
- D. de Caen; E. R. van Dam (1999). "Association Schemes Related to Kasami Codes and Kerdock Sets". Designs, Codes and Cryptography. 18 (1): 89–102. doi:10.1023/A:1008385102731. S2CID 6386298.
- D. De Caen; G. e. Moorhouse (1999). "The ρ-rank of the Sρ (4,ρ) Generalized Quadrangle" (PDF). Archived from the original (PDF) on 2012-06-19.
- D. De Caen (1998). "An upper bound on the sum of squares of degrees in a graph". Discrete Mathematics. 185 (1–3): 245–248. doi:10.1016/S0012-365X(97)00213-6.
- Dominique De Caen (1998). "The Spectra of Complementary Subgraphs in a Strongly Regular Graph". European Journal of Combinatorics. 19 (5): 559–565. doi:10.1006/eujc.1998.0225.
- D. de Caen (1998). "Stellar permutations of the two-element subsets of a finite set". Journal of Combinatorial Designs. 6 (5): 381–387. doi:10.1002/(SICI)1520-6610(1998)6:5<381::AID-JCD6>3.3.CO;2-S.
- D. De Caen (1997). "A lower bound on the probability of a union". Discrete Mathematics. 169 (1–3): 217–220. doi:10.1016/S0012-365X(96)00107-0.
- D. De Caen; László A. Székely (1997). "On Dense Bipartite Graphs of Girth Eight and Upper Bounds for Certain Configurations in Planar Point-Line Systems". Journal of Combinatorial Theory. 77 (2): 268–278. doi:10.1006/jcta.1997.2745.
- D. de Caen (1996). "Degree of indecomposability of certain highly regular zero-one matrices". Linear Algebra and Its Applications. 247: 151–158. doi:10.1016/0024-3795(95)00111-5.
- D. de Caen; R. Mathon; G. E. Moorhouse (1995). "A Family of Antipodal Distance-Regular Graphs Related to the Classical Preparata Codes". Journal of Algebraic Combinatorics. 4 (4): 317–327. doi:10.1023/A:1022429800058.
- D de Caen (1992). "Algebraic multiplicity of the eigen values of a tournament matrix". Linear Algebra and Its Applications. 169: 179–193. doi:10.1016/0024-3795(92)90178-D.
- D. De Caen; Chris D. Godsil; Gordon F. Royle (1992). "On the ρ Rank of Incidence Matrices and a Bound of Bruen and Ott". Designs, Codes and Cryptography. 2 (4): 391–394. doi:10.1007/BF00125204. S2CID 43007490.
- D. De Caen; Donald L. Kreher; Stanislaw P. Radziszowski; W. H. Mills (1991). "On the covering of t-sets with (t + 1)-sets: C (9 5 4) and C (10 6 5)" (PDF). Discrete Mathematics. 92 (1–3): 65–77. doi:10.1016/0012-365X(91)90267-6.
- D. De Caen (1988). "On a theorem of König's on bipartite graphs". Journal of Combinatorics, Information & Systems Sciences. 13 (3–4): 127.
- Dominique De Caen; David A. Gregory (1988). "Factorizations of symmetric designs". Journal of Combinatorial Theory. 49 (2): 323–337. doi:10.1016/0097-3165(88)90059-3.
- D. De Caen; Paul Erdős; N. J. Pullmann; Nicholas C. Wormald (1986). "Extremal clique coverings of complementary graphs". Combinatorica. 6 (4): 309–314. CiteSeerX 10.1.1.210.8310. doi:10.1007/BF02579256. S2CID 10790512.
- D. De Caen; D. Gregory (1980). "Prime boolean matrices". Prime bollean matrices. Lecture Notes in Mathematics. Vol. 829. pp. 76–82. doi:10.1007/BFb0088902. ISBN 978-3-540-10254-0.
