= Complete coloring =

Vertex coloring where every color pairing appears at least once

Complete coloring of the Clebsch graph with 8 colors. Every pair of colors appears on at least one edge. No complete coloring with more colors exists: in any 9-coloring some color would appear only at one vertex, and there would not be enough neighboring vertices to cover all pairs involving that color. Therefore, the achromatic number of the Clebsch graph is 8.

In graph theory, a complete coloring is a (proper) vertex coloring in which every pair of colors appears on at least one pair of adjacent vertices. Equivalently, a complete coloring is minimal in the sense that it cannot be transformed into a proper coloring with fewer colors by merging pairs of color classes. The achromatic number ψ(G) of a graph G is the maximum number of colors possible in any complete coloring of G.

A complete coloring is the opposite of a harmonious coloring, which requires every pair of colors to appear on at most one pair of adjacent vertices.

== Complexity theory ==
Finding ψ(G) is an optimization problem. The decision problem for complete coloring can be phrased as:

INSTANCE: a graph G = (V, E) and positive integer k
QUESTION: does there exist a partition of V into k or more disjoint sets V_{1}, V_{2}, …, V_{k} such that each V_{i} is an independent set for G and such that for each pair of distinct sets V_{i}, V_{j}, V_{i} ∪ V_{j} is not an independent set.

Determining the achromatic number is NP-hard; determining if it is greater than a given number is NP-complete, as shown by Yannakakis and Gavril in 1978 by transformation from the minimum maximal matching problem.

Note that any coloring of a graph with the minimum number of colors must be a complete coloring, so minimizing the number of colors in a complete coloring is just a restatement of the standard graph coloring problem.

== Algorithms ==
For any fixed k, it is possible to determine whether the achromatic number of a given graph is at least k, in linear time.

The optimization problem permits approximation and is approximable within a $O\left(|V|/\sqrt{\log |V|}\right)$ approximation ratio.

== Special classes of graphs ==
The NP-completeness of the achromatic number problem holds also for some special classes of graphs: bipartite graphs, complements of bipartite graphs (that is, graphs having no independent set of more than two vertices), cographs and interval graphs, and even for trees.

For complements of trees, the achromatic number can be computed in polynomial time. For trees, it can be approximated to within a constant factor.

The achromatic number of an n-dimensional hypercube graph is known to be proportional to $\sqrt{n2^n}$, but the constant of proportionality is not known precisely.
