= Gain graph =

Graph with group-labeled edges

A gain graph is a graph whose edges are labelled "invertibly", or "orientably", by elements of a group G. This means that, if an edge e in one direction has label g (a group element), then in the other direction it has label g^{−1}. The label function φ therefore has the property that it is defined differently, but not independently, on the two different orientations, or directions, of an edge e. The group G is called the gain group, φ is the gain function, and the value φ(e) is the gain of e (in some indicated direction). A gain graph is a generalization of a signed graph, where the gain group G has only two elements. See Zaslavsky (1989, 1991).

A gain should not be confused with a weight on an edge, whose value is independent of the orientation of the edge.

== Applications ==
Some reasons to be interested in gain graphs are their connections to network flow theory in combinatorial optimization, to geometry, and to physics.

- The mathematics of a network with gains, or generalized network, is connected with the frame matroid of the gain graph.
- Suppose we have some hyperplanes in R ^{n} given by equations of the form x_{j} = g x_{i} . The geometry of the hyperplanes can be treated by using the following gain graph: The vertex set is {1,2,...,n}. There is an edge ij with gain g (in the direction from i to j) for each hyperplane with equation x_{j} = g x_{i} . These hyperplanes are treated through the frame matroid of the gain graph (Zaslavsky 2003).
- Or, suppose we have hyperplanes given by equations of the form x_{j} = x_{i} + g. The geometry of these hyperplanes can be treated by using the gain graph with the same vertex set and an edge ij with gain g (in the direction from i to j) for each hyperplane with equation x_{j} = x_{i} + g. These hyperplanes are studied via the lift matroid of the gain graph (Zaslavsky 2003).
- Suppose the gain group has an action on a set Q. Assigning an element s_{i} of Q to each vertex gives a state of the gain graph. An edge is satisfied if, for each edge ij with gain g (in the direction from i to j), the equation s_{j} = s_{i} g is satisfied; otherwise it is frustrated. A state is satisfied if every edge is satisfied. In physics this corresponds to a ground state (a state of lowest energy), if such a state exists. An important problem in physics, especially in the theory of spin glasses, is to determine a state with the fewest frustrated edges.

== Related concepts ==
Gain graphs used in topological graph theory as a means to construct graph embeddings in surfaces are known as "voltage graphs" (Gross 1974; Gross and Tucker 1977). The term "gain graph" is more usual in other contexts, e.g., biased graph theory and matroid theory. The term group-labelled graph has also been used, but it is ambiguous since "group labels" may be—and have been—treated as weights.

Since much of the theory of gain graphs is a special case of that of biased graphs (and much of the theory of biased graphs is a generalization of that of gain graphs), the reader should refer to the article on biased graphs for more information and examples.
