= Tutte–Grothendieck invariant =

Type of graph invariant

In mathematics, a Tutte–Grothendieck (TG) invariant is a type of graph invariant that satisfies a generalized deletion–contraction formula. Any evaluation of the Tutte polynomial would be an example of a TG invariant.

== Definition ==
A graph function f is TG-invariant if:

$$f(G) = \begin{cases}
c^{|V(G)|} & \text{if G has no edges} \\
xf(G/e) & \text{if } e \text{ is a bridge} \\
yf(G \backslash e) & \text{if } e \text{ is a loop} \\
af(G/e) + bf(G \backslash e) & \text{else}
\end{cases}$$

Above G / e denotes edge contraction whereas G \ e denotes deletion. The numbers c, x, y, a, b are parameters.

== Generalization to matroids ==
The matroid function f is TG if:

$$\begin{align}
&f(M_1\oplus M_2) = f(M_1)f(M_2) \\
&f(M) = a f(M \backslash e) + b f(M / e) \ \ \ \text{if } e \text{ is not coloop or bridge}
\end{align}$$

It can be shown that f is given by:

$$f(M) = a^{|E| - r(E)}b^{r(E)} T(M; x_0/b, y_0/a)$$

where $x_0$ is the value f takes on coloops, $y_0$ is the value f takes on loops, E is the edge set of M; r is the rank function; and

$$T(M; x, y) = \sum_{A \subset E(M)} (x-1)^{r(E)-r(A)} (y-1)^{|A|-r(A)}$$

is the generalization of the Tutte polynomial to matroids.

== Grothendieck group ==
The invariant is named after Alexander Grothendieck because of a similar construction of the Grothendieck group used in the Riemann–Roch theorem. For more details see:

- Tutte, W. T. (2008). "A ring in graph theory". Mathematical Proceedings of the Cambridge Philosophical Society. 43 (1): 26–40. doi:10.1017/S0305004100023173. ISSN 0305-0041. MR 0018406.
- Brylawski, T. H. (1972). "The Tutte-Grothendieck ring". Algebra Universalis. 2 (1): 375–388. doi:10.1007/BF02945050. ISSN 0002-5240. MR 0330004.
