= Hosoya =

Hosoya (written: 細谷 or 細矢^{?}) is a Japanese surname. Notable people with the surname include:

- Eiji Hosoya (細谷 英二, c. 1945 – 2012), Japanese businessman
- Haruna Hosoya (細谷 はるな, born 1973), Japanese triathlete
- Haruo Hosoya (細矢 治夫, born 1936), Japanese chemist and professor
  - Hosoya index
- Kei Hosoya (細谷 圭, born 1988), Japanese baseball player
- Mao Hosoya (細谷 真大, born 2001), Japanese footballer
- Susumi Hosoya (細谷 進, born 1942), Japanese rower
- Yoshimasa Hosoya (細谷 佳正, born 1982), Japanese voice actor

== See also ==
- Hosoya Station (disambiguation), multiple railway stations in Japan
