= Chromatic symmetric function =

Symmetric function invariant of graphs

The chromatic symmetric function is a symmetric function invariant of graphs studied in algebraic graph theory, a branch of mathematics. It is the weight generating function for proper graph colorings, and was originally introduced by Richard Stanley as a generalization of the chromatic polynomial of a graph.

== Definition ==
For a finite graph $G=(V,E)$ with vertex set $V=\{v_1,v_2,\ldots, v_n\}$, a vertex coloring is a function $\kappa:V\to C$ where $C$ is a set of colors. A vertex coloring is called proper if all adjacent vertices are assigned distinct colors (i.e., $\{i,j\}\in E \implies \kappa(i)\neq\kappa(j)$). The chromatic symmetric function denoted $X_G(x_1,x_2,\ldots)$ is defined to be the weight generating function of proper vertex colorings of $G$:
$$X_G(x_1,x_2,\ldots):=\sum_{\underset{\text{proper}}{\kappa:V\to\N}}x_{\kappa(v_1)}x_{\kappa(v_2)}\cdots x_{\kappa(v_n)}$$

== Examples ==
For $\lambda$ a partition, let $m_\lambda$ be the monomial symmetric polynomial associated to $\lambda$.

=== Example 1: complete graphs ===
Consider the complete graph $K_n$ on $n$ vertices:

- There are $n!$ ways to color $K_n$ with exactly $n$ colors yielding the term $n!x_1\cdots x_n$
- Since every pair of vertices in $K_n$ is adjacent, it can be properly colored with no fewer than $n$ colors.

Thus, $X_{K_n}(x_1,\ldots,x_n)=n!x_1\cdots x_n = n!m_{(1,\ldots,1)}$

=== Example 2: a path graph ===
Consider the path graph $P_3$ of length $3$:

- There are $3!$ ways to color $P_3$ with exactly $3$ colors, yielding the term $6x_1x_2x_3$
- For each pair of colors, there are $2$ ways to color $P_3$ yielding the terms $x_i^2x_j$ and $x_ix_j^2$ for $i\neq j$

Altogether, the chromatic symmetric function of $P_3$ is then given by:
$$X_{P_3}(x_1,x_2,x_3) = 6x_1x_2x_3 + x_1^2x_2 + x_1x_2^2 + x_1^2x_3 + x_1x_3^2 + x_2^2x_3 + x_2x_3^2 = 6m_{(1,1,1)} + m_{(1,2)}$$

== Properties ==
- Let $\chi_G$ be the chromatic polynomial of $G$, so that $\chi_G(k)$ is equal to the number of proper vertex colorings of $G$ using at most $k$ distinct colors. The values of $\chi_G$ can then be computed by specializing the chromatic symmetric function, setting the first $k$ variables $x_i$ equal to $1$ and the remaining variables equal to $0$:
  $$X_G(1^k)=X_G(1,\ldots,1,0,0,\ldots)=\chi_G(k)$$
- If $G\amalg H$ is the disjoint union of two graphs, then the chromatic symmetric function for $G\amalg H$ can be written as a product of the corresponding functions for $G$ and $H$:
  $$X_{G\amalg H}=X_G\cdot X_H$$
- A stable partition $\pi$ of $G$ is defined to be a set partition of vertices $V$ such that each block of $\pi$ is an independent set in $G$. The type of a stable partition $\text{type}(\pi)$ is the partition consisting of parts equal to the sizes of the connected components of the vertex induced subgraphs. For a partition $\lambda\vdash n$, let $z_\lambda$ be the number of stable partitions of $G$ with $\text{type}(\pi)=\lambda=\langle1^{r_1}2^{r2}\ldots\rangle$. Then, $X_G$ expands into the augmented monomial symmetric functions, $\tilde{m}_\lambda:=r_1!r_2!\cdots m_\lambda$ with coefficients given by the number of stable partitions of $G$:
  $$X_G=\sum_{\lambda\vdash n}z_\lambda \tilde{m}_\lambda$$
- Let $p_\lambda$ be the power-sum symmetric function associated to a partition $\lambda$. For $S\subseteq E$, let $\lambda(S)$ be the partition whose parts are the vertex sizes of the connected components of the edge-induced subgraph of $G$ specified by $S$. The chromatic symmetric function can be expanded in the power-sum symmetric functions via the following formula:
  $$X_G=\sum_{S\subseteq E}(-1)^{|S|}p_{\lambda(S)}$$
- Let $X_G=\sum_{\lambda\vdash n}c_\lambda e_\lambda$ be the expansion of $X_G$ in the basis of elementary symmetric functions $e_\lambda$. Let $\text{sink}(G,s)$ be the number of acyclic orientations on the graph $G$ which contain exactly $s$ sinks. Then we have the following formula for the number of sinks:
  $$\text{sink}(G,s)=\sum_{\underset{l(\lambda)=s}{\lambda\vdash n}}c_\lambda$$

== Problems regarding the chromatic symmetric functions ==
There are a number of questions regarding the chromatic symmetric function which have received substantial attention in the literature surrounding them.

=== (3+1)-free conjecture ===
For a partition $\lambda$, let $e_\lambda$ be the elementary symmetric function associated to $\lambda$.

A partially ordered set $P$ is called $(3+1)$-free if it does not contain a subposet isomorphic to the direct sum of the $3$ element chain and the $1$ element chain. The incomparability graph $\text{inc}(P)$ of a poset $P$ is the graph with vertices given by the elements of $P$ which includes an edge between two vertices if and only if their corresponding elements in $P$ are incomparable. The following result was conjectured by Stanley and Stembridge in 1993 and proven by Tatsuyuki Hikita in 2024.

Theorem (Hikita) Let $G$ be the incomparability graph of a $(3+1)$-free poset, then $X_G$ is $e$-positive.

A weaker positivity result is known for the case of expansions into the basis of Schur functions.

Theorem (Gasharov) Let $G$ be the incomparability graph of a $(3+1)$-free poset, then $X_G$ is $s$-positive.

In the proof of the theorem above, there is a combinatorial formula for the coefficients of the Schur expansion given in terms of $P$-tableaux which are a generalization of semistandard Young tableaux instead labelled with the elements of $P$.

== Generalizations ==
There are a number of generalizations of the chromatic symmetric function:

- There is a categorification of the invariant into a homology theory which is called chromatic symmetric homology. This homology theory is known to be a stronger invariant than the chromatic symmetric function alone. The chromatic symmetric function can also be defined for vertex-weighted graphs, where it satisfies a deletion-contraction property analogous to that of the chromatic polynomial. If the theory of chromatic symmetric homology is generalized to vertex-weighted graphs as well, this deletion-contraction property lifts to a long exact sequence of the corresponding homology theory.
- There is also a quasisymmetric refinement of the chromatic symmetric function which can be used to refine the formulae expressing $X_G$ in terms of Gessel's basis of fundamental quasisymmetric functions and the expansion in the basis of Schur functions. Fixing an order for the set of vertices, the ascent set of a proper coloring $\kappa$ is defined to be $\text{asc}(\kappa)=\{\{i,j\}\in E:i<j \text{ and } \kappa(i)<\kappa(j)\}$. The chromatic quasisymmetric function of a graph $G$ is then defined to be:
  $$X_G(x_1,x_2,\ldots;t):=\sum_{\underset{\text{proper}}{\kappa:V\to \N}}t^{|asc(\kappa)|}x_{\kappa(v_1)}\cdots x_{\kappa(v_n)}$$

== See also ==
- Chromatic polynomial
- Symmetric function
