= NZF =

NZF may refer to:

- New Zealand First, a political party
- New Zealand Football, an association football organisation
- Nowhere-zero flow, a concept in graph theory
