= Tutte polynomial =

Algebraic encoding of graph connectivity

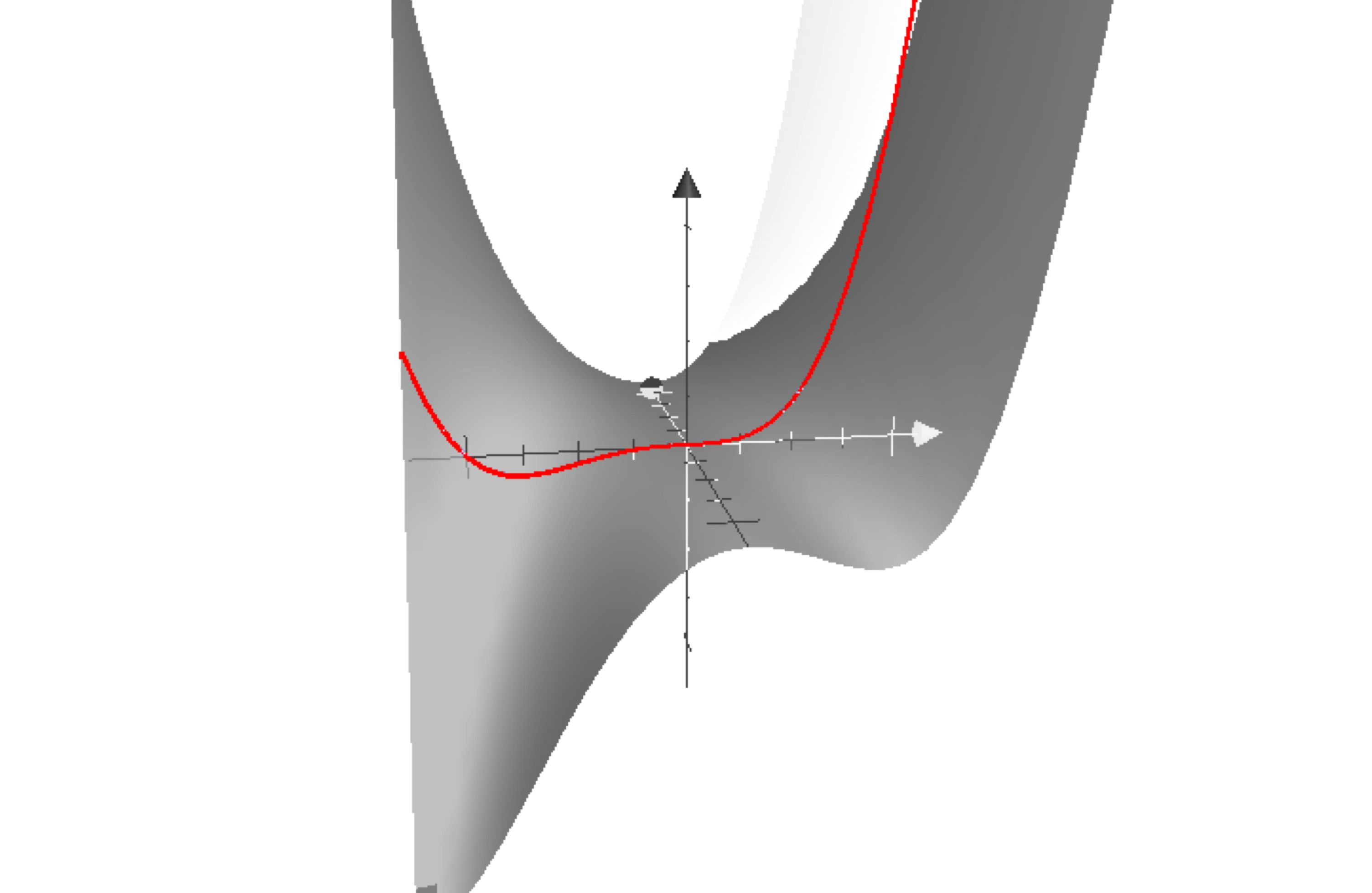
The polynomial $x^4+x^3+x^2y$ is the Tutte polynomial of the bull graph. The red line shows the intersection with the plane $y=0$, which is equivalent to the chromatic polynomial.

The Tutte polynomial, also called the dichromate or the Tutte–Whitney polynomial, is a graph polynomial. It is a polynomial in two variables which plays an important role in graph theory. It is defined for every undirected graph $G$ and contains information about how the graph is connected. It is denoted by $T_G$.

The importance of this polynomial stems from the information it contains about $G$. Though originally studied in algebraic graph theory as a generalization of counting problems related to graph coloring and nowhere-zero flow, it contains several famous other specializations from other sciences such as the Jones polynomial from knot theory and the partition functions of the Potts model from statistical physics. It is also the source of several central computational problems in theoretical computer science.

The Tutte polynomial has several equivalent definitions. It is essentially equivalent to Whitney’s rank polynomial, Tutte’s own dichromatic polynomial and Fortuin–Kasteleyn’s random cluster model under simple transformations. It is essentially a generating function for the number of edge sets of a given size and number of connected components, with immediate generalizations to matroids. It is also the most general graph invariant that can be defined by a deletion–contraction recurrence. Several textbooks about graph theory and matroid theory devote entire chapters to it.

== Definitions ==
Definition. For an undirected graph $G=(V,E)$ one may define the Tutte polynomial as

$$T_G(x,y)=\sum\nolimits_{A\subseteq E} (x-1)^{k(A)-k(E)}(y-1)^{k(A)+|A|-|V|},$$

where $k(A)$ denotes the number of connected components of the graph $(V,A)$.

In this definition it is clear that $T_G$ is well-defined and a polynomial in $x$ and $y$.

The same definition can be given using slightly different notation by letting $r(A)=|V|-k(A)$ denote the rank of the graph $(V,A)$. Then the Whitney rank generating function is defined as

$$R_G(u,v)=\sum\nolimits_{A\subseteq E} u^{r(E)-r(A)} v^{|A|-r(A)}.$$

The two functions are equivalent under a simple change of variables:

$$T_G(x,y)=R_G(x-1,y-1).$$

Tutte’s dichromatic polynomial $Q_G$ is the result of another simple transformation:

$$T_G(x,y)=(x-1)^{-k(G)} Q_G(x-1,y-1).$$

Tutte’s original definition of $T_G$ is equivalent but less easily stated. For connected $G$ we set

$$T_G(x,y)=\sum\nolimits_{i,j} t_{ij} x^iy^j,$$

where $t_{ij}$ denotes the number of spanning trees of internal activity $i$ and external activity $j$. To define these notions, we assume that the set of edges of the graph is totally ordered, $e_1,e_2,\dots$, and suppose given a spanning tree $T$. An edge $e_i \in T$ is said to be internally active if it is the smallest edge of its fundamental cutset. Dually, an edge $e_i \notin T$ is said to be externally active if it is the smallest edge of its fundamental cycle. The internal activity and external activity of a spanning tree are the numbers of internal and external edges, respectively. Although the specific set of internal and external edges depends on the choice of total order on the edges, the total number $t_{ij}$ of spanning trees of internal activity $i$ and external activity $j$ is independent of the order chosen. Moreover, this definition of $T_G$ extends to not-necessarily-connected graphs if we take $t_{ij}$ to be the number of spanning forests of internal activity $i$ and external activity $j$, where a "spanning forest" is meant in the sense of a collection of spanning trees, one for each connected component of $G$.

A third definition uses a deletion–contraction recurrence. The edge contraction $G/uv$ of graph $G$ is the graph obtained by merging the vertices $u$ and $v$ and removing the edge $uv$. We write $G - uv$ for the graph where the edge $uv$ is merely removed. Then the Tutte polynomial is defined by the recurrence relation

$$T_G= T_{G-e}+T_{G/e},$$

if $e$ is neither a loop nor a bridge, with base case

$$T_G(x,y)= x^i y^j,$$

if $G$ contains $i$ bridges and $j$ loops and no other edges. In particular, $T_G=1$ if $G$ contains no edges.

The random cluster model from statistical mechanics due to Fortuin & Kasteleyn (1972) provides yet another equivalent definition. The partition sum

$$Z_G(q,w)=\sum\nolimits_{F\subseteq E}q^{k(F)}w^{|F|}$$

is equivalent to $T_G$ under the transformation

$$T_G(x, y)=(x-1)^{-k(E)}(y-1)^{-|V|} \cdot Z_G\Big((x-1)(y-1),\; y-1\Big).$$

== Properties ==
The Tutte polynomial factors into connected components. If $G$ is the union of disjoint graphs $H$ and $H'$ then

$$T_G= T_H \cdot T_{H'}$$

Isomorphic graphs have the same Tutte polynomial, but the converse is not true. For example, the Tutte polynomial of every forest on $m$ edges is $x^m$.

If $G$ is planar and $G^*$ denotes its dual graph then

$$T_G(x,y)= T_{G^*} (y,x)$$

In particular, the chromatic polynomial of a planar graph is the flow polynomial of its dual. Tutte refers to such functions as V-functions.

== Examples ==
Example calculation of Tutte polynomial via deletion-contraction formula.

Example calculation of Tutte polynomial by enumeration of spanning trees, with indication of internal and external activities in red and blue respectively.

The figures show two ways of calculating the Tutte polynomial $T_G = x^3 + x^2 + xy$ of a small graph with four nodes and four edges, either via the deletion–contraction formula or by enumeration of spanning trees.

Tutte polynomials are often given in tabular form by listing the coefficients $t_{ij}$ of $x^iy^j$ in row $i$ and column $j$. For example, the Tutte polynomial of the Petersen graph,

$$\begin{align}
36 x &+ 120 x^2 + 180 x^3 + 170x^4+114x^5 + 56x^6 +21 x^7 + 6x^8 + x^9 \\
&+ 36y +84 y^2 + 75 y^3 +35 y^4 + 9y^5+y^6 \\
&+ 168xy + 240x^2y +170x^3y +70 x^4y + 12x^5 y \\
&+ 171xy^2+105 x^2y^2 + 30x^3y^2 \\
&+ 65xy^3 +15x^2y^3 \\
&+10xy^4,
\end{align}$$

is given by the following table.

0	36	84	75	35	9	1
36	168	171	65	10		
120	240	105	15			
180	170	30				
170	70					
114	12					
56
21
6
1

Other example, the Tutte polynomial of the octahedron graph is given by

$$\begin{align}
&12\,{y}^{2}{x}^{2}+11\,x+11\,y+40\,{y}^{3}+32\,{
y}^{2}+46\,yx+24\,x{y}^{3}+52\,x{y}^{2} \\
&+25\,{x}^{2}+29\,{y}^{4}+15\,{y
}^{5}+5\,{y}^{6}+6\,{y}^{4}x \\
&+39\,y{x}^{2}+20\,{x}^{3}+{y}^{7}+8\,y{x}^
{3}+7\,{x}^{4}+{x}^{5}
\end{align}$$

== History ==
The polynomial was introduced by W. T. Tutte in his 1954 paper, "A contribution to the theory of chromatic polynomials". Tutte’s interest in the deletion–contraction formula started already in his undergraduate days at Trinity College, Cambridge, originally motivated by perfect rectangles and spanning trees. As he wrote in a later account, he often applied the formula in his research and “wondered if there were other interesting functions of graphs, invariant under isomorphism, with similar recursion formulae.” R. M. Foster had already observed that the chromatic polynomial is one such function, and Tutte began to discover more, which he wrote about in a paper published in 1947, "A ring in graph theory". His original terminology for graph invariants that satisfy the deletion–contraction recursion was W-function, and V-function if multiplicative over components. Tutte writes in the later account, “Playing with my W-functions I obtained a two-variable polynomial from which either the chromatic polynomial or the flow-polynomial could be obtained by setting one of the variables equal to zero, and adjusting signs.” Tutte called this function the dichromate, as he saw it as a generalization of the chromatic polynomial to two variables, but it is usually referred to as the Tutte polynomial. In Tutte’s words, “This may be unfair to Hassler Whitney who knew and used analogous coefficients without bothering to affix them to two variables.” (There is “notable confusion” about the terms dichromate and dichromatic polynomial, introduced by Tutte in the earlier 1947 paper, the two differing only slightly by a change of variables.) The generalisation of the Tutte polynomial to matroids was first published by Crapo, though it appears already in Tutte’s thesis.

Independently of the work in algebraic graph theory, Potts began studying the partition function of certain models in statistical mechanics in 1952. The work by Fortuin and Kasteleyn on the random cluster model, a generalisation of the Potts model, provided a unifying expression that showed the relation to the Tutte polynomial.

== Specialisations ==
Evaluating the Tutte polynomial at various points and lines of the $(x,y)$-plane recovers quantities that have been studied in their own right in diverse fields of mathematics and physics, and part of the appeal of the Tutte polynomial thus comes from the unifying framework it provides for analysing these quantities. Here we list various polynomials that can be recovered as specializations of the Tutte polynomial, up to a factor that depends only on the number of components, rank, and/or nullity of a graph.

=== Chromatic polynomial ===
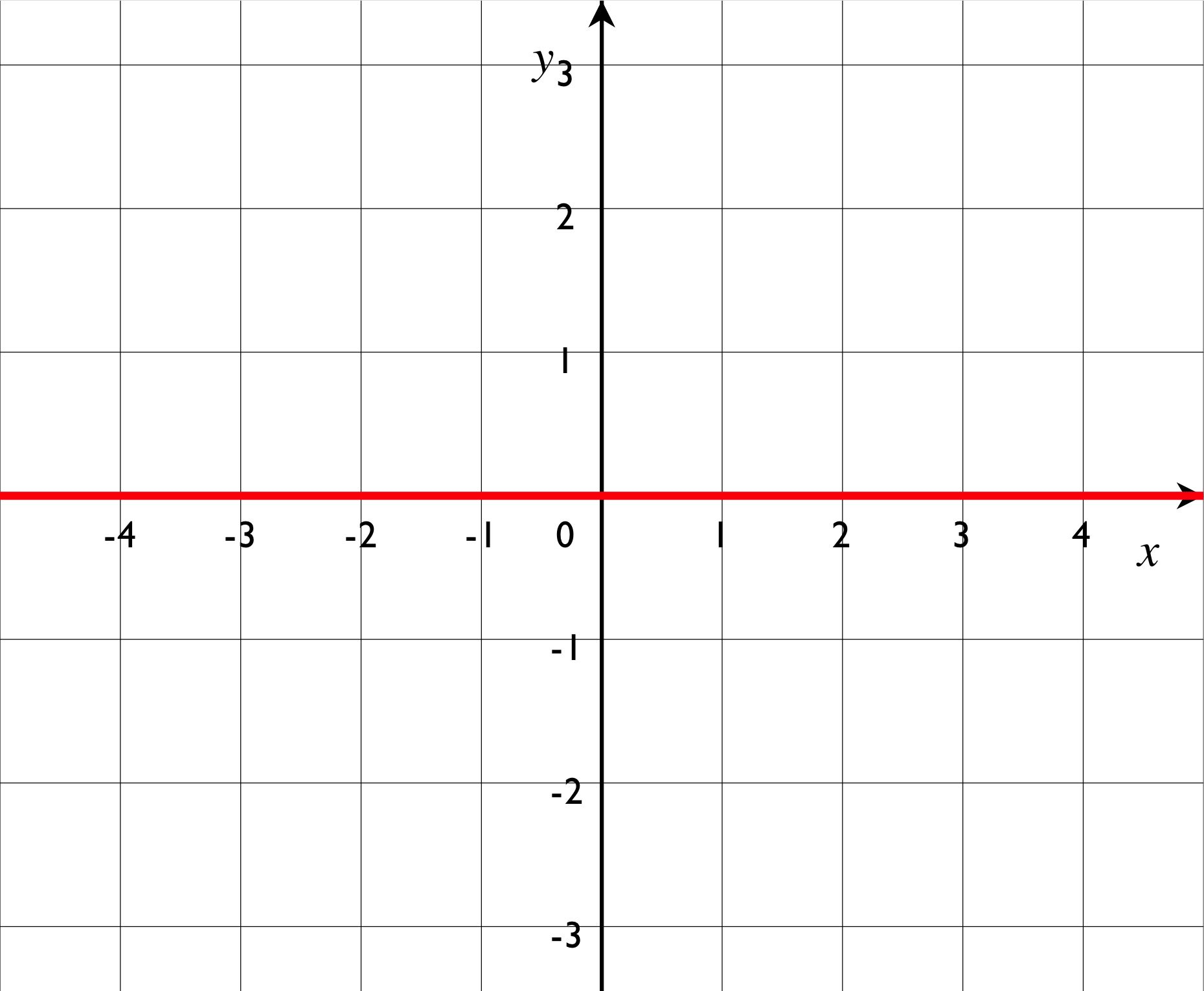
The chromatic polynomial drawn in the Tutte plane

The chromatic polynomial can be recovered from the Tutte polynomial by evaluating at $y=0$,

$$\chi_G(\lambda) = (-1)^{|V|-k(G)} \lambda^{k(G)} T_G(1-\lambda,0),$$

where $k(G)$ denotes the number of connected components of G.

For integer λ the value of chromatic polynomial $\chi_G(\lambda)$ equals the number of vertex colourings of G using a set of λ colours. It is clear that $\chi_G(\lambda)$ does not depend on the set of colours. What is less clear is that it is the evaluation at λ of a polynomial with integer coefficients. To see this, we observe:

1. If G has n vertices and no edges, then $\chi_G(\lambda) = \lambda^n$.
2. If G contains a loop (a single edge connecting a vertex to itself), then $\chi_G(\lambda) = 0$.
3. If e is an edge which is not a loop, then

$$\chi_G(\lambda) = \chi_{G - e}(\lambda) - \chi_{G/e}(\lambda).$$

The three conditions above enable us to calculate $\chi_G(\lambda)$, by applying a sequence of edge deletions and contractions; but they give no guarantee that a different sequence of deletions and contractions will lead to the same value. The guarantee comes from the fact that $\chi_G(\lambda)$ counts something, independently of the recurrence. In particular,

$$T_G(2,0) = (-1)^{|V|} \chi_G(-1)$$

gives the number of acyclic orientations.

=== Jones polynomial ===
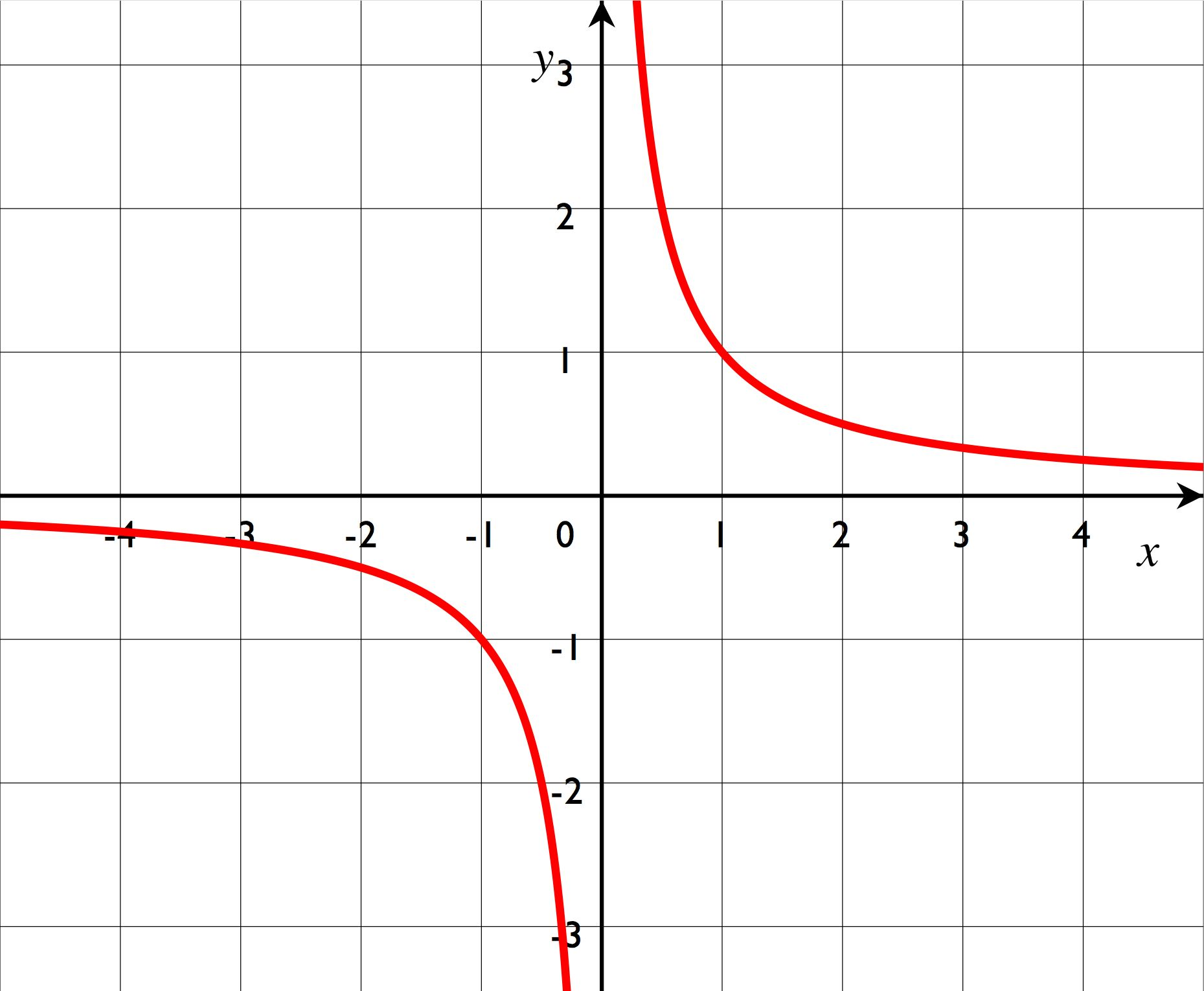
The Jones polynomial drawn in the Tutte plane

Along the hyperbola $xy=1$, the Tutte polynomial of a planar graph specialises to the Jones polynomial of an associated alternating knot obtained via the medial graph construction. Louis Kauffman has proposed a generalization of the Tutte polynomial for signed graphs, which yields by the medial construction a knot polynomial that specializes to the Jones polynomial as well as to the Kauffman bracket polynomial.

=== Individual points ===
==== (2, 1) ====
$T_G(2,1)$ counts the number of forests, i.e., the number of acyclic edge subsets.

==== (1, 1) ====
$T_G(1,1)$ counts the number of spanning forests (edge subsets without cycles and the same number of connected components as G). If the graph is connected, $T_G(1,1)$ counts the number of spanning trees.

==== (1, 2) ====
$T_G(1,2)$ counts the number of spanning subgraphs (edge subsets with the same number of connected components as G).

==== (2, 0) ====
$T_G(2,0)$ counts the number of acyclic orientations of G.

==== (0, 2) ====
$T_G(0,2)$ counts the number of strongly connected orientations of G.

==== (2, 2) ====
$T_G(2,2)$ is the number $2^{|E|}$ where $|E|$ is the number of edges of graph G.

==== (0, −2) ====
If G is a 4-regular graph, then

$$(-1)^{|V|+k(G)}T_G(0,-2)$$

counts the number of Eulerian orientations of G. Here $k(G)$ is the number of connected components of G.

==== (3, 3) ====
If G is the m × n grid graph, then $2 T_G(3,3)$ counts the number of ways to tile a rectangle of width 4m and height 4n with T-tetrominoes.

If G is a planar graph, then $2 T_G(3,3)$ equals the sum over weighted Eulerian orientations in a medial graph of G, where the weight of an orientation is 2 to the number of saddle vertices of the orientation (that is, the number of vertices with incident edges cyclicly ordered "in, out, in out").

=== Potts and Ising models ===
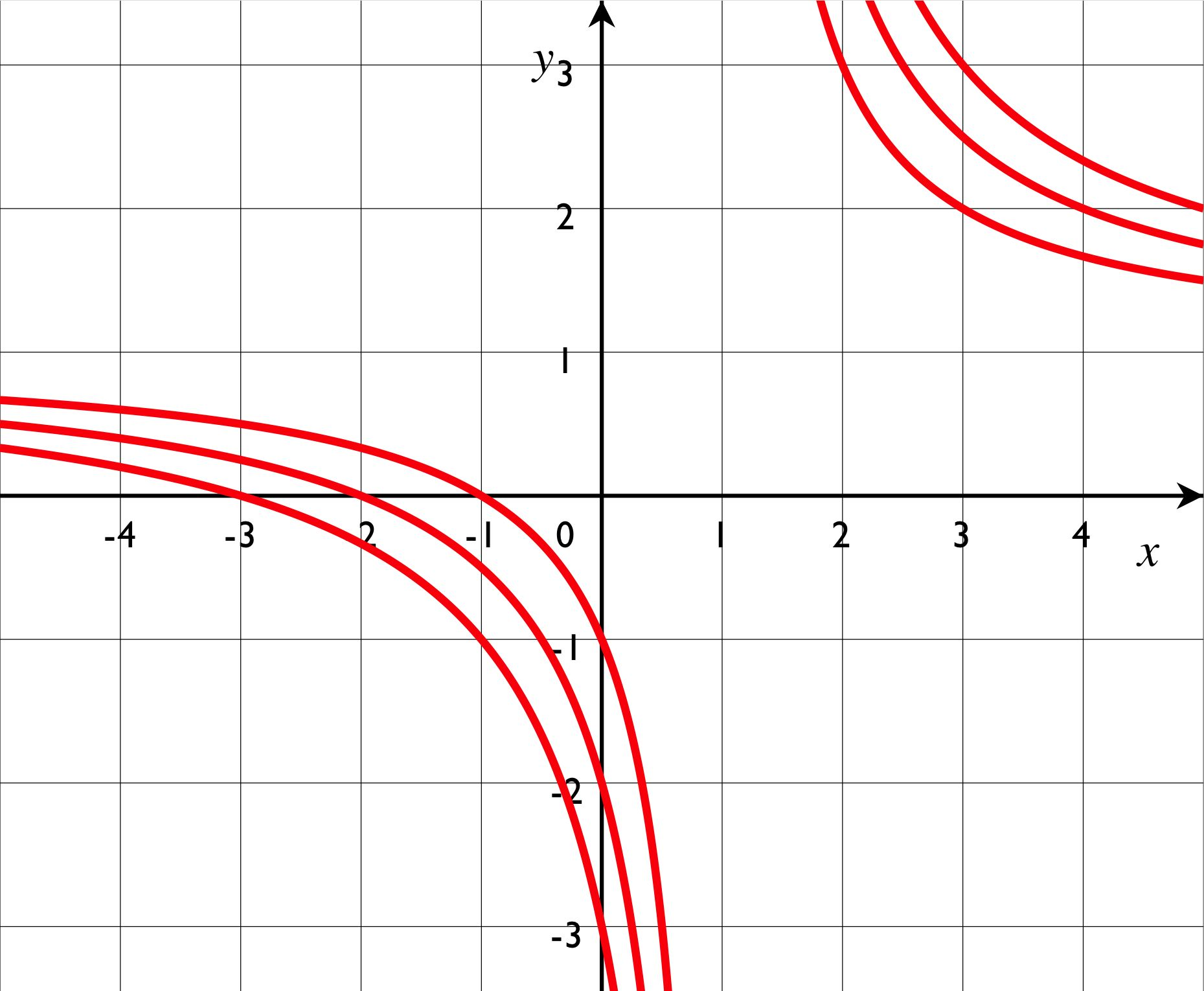
The partition functions for the Ising model and the 3- and 4-state Potts models drawn in the Tutte plane.

Define the hyperbola in the xy−plane:

$$H_2: \quad (x-1)(y-1)=2,$$

the Tutte polynomial evaluated at the hyperbola determines the partition function, $Z(\cdot),$ of the Ising model studied in statistical physics. Specifically, along the hyperbola $H_2$ the two are related by the equation:

$$Z(G) = 2\left(e^{-\alpha}\right)^{|E| - r(E)} \left(4 \sinh \alpha \right )^{r(E)}  T_G \left (\coth \alpha, e^{2 \alpha} \right).$$

In particular,

$$(\coth \alpha - 1) \left(e^{2 \alpha} - 1 \right ) = 2$$

for all complex α.

More generally, if for any positive integer q, we define the hyperbola:

$$H_q: \quad (x-1)(y-1)=q,$$

then the Tutte polynomial determines the partition function of the q-state Potts model. Various physical quantities analysed in the framework of the Potts model translate to specific parts of the $H_q$.

Correspondences between the Potts model and the Tutte plane
Potts model	Tutte polynomial
Ferromagnetic	Positive branch of $H_q$
Antiferromagnetic	Negative branch of $H_q$ with $y>0$
High temperature	Asymptote of $H_q$ to $y=1$
Low temperature ferromagnetic	Positive branch of $H_q$ asymptotic to $x=1$
Zero temperature antiferromagnetic	Graph q-colouring, i.e., $x=1-q, y=0$

=== Flow polynomial ===
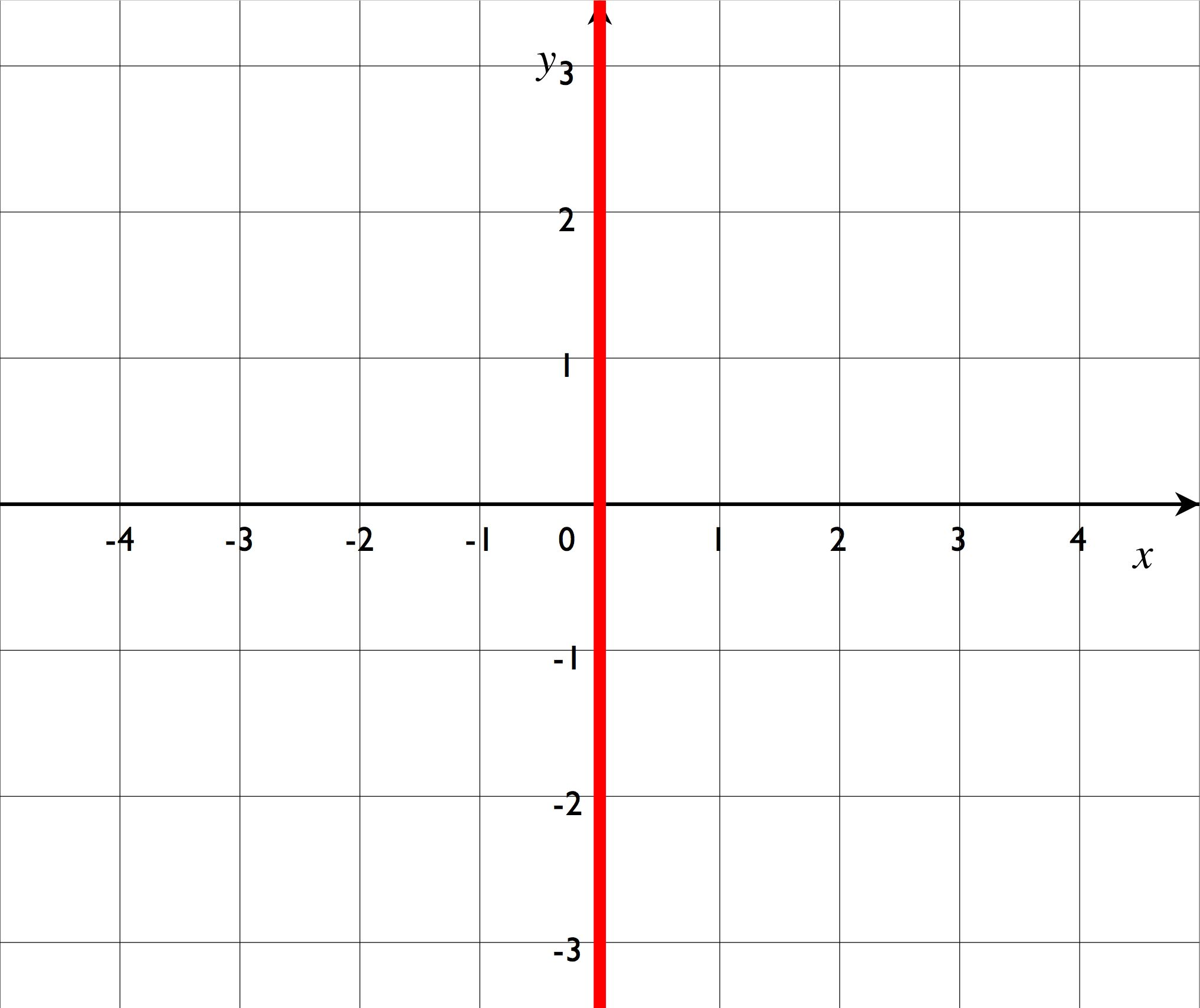
The flow polynomial drawn in the Tutte plane

The flow polynomial studied in combinatorics can be recovered from the Tutte polynomial by evaluating at $x=0$. For a connected and undirected graph G and integer k, a nowhere-zero k-flow is an assignment of “flow” values $1,2,\dots,k-1$ to the edges of an arbitrary orientation of G such that the total flow entering and leaving each vertex is congruent modulo k. The flow polynomial $C_G(k)$ denotes the number of nowhere-zero k-flows. This value is intimately connected with the chromatic polynomial, in fact, if G is a planar graph, the chromatic polynomial of G is equivalent to the flow polynomial of its dual graph $G^*$ in the sense that

Theorem (Tutte). $C_G(k)=k^{-1} \chi_{G^*}(k).$

The connection to the Tutte polynomial is given by:

$$C_G(k)= (-1)^{|E|-|V|+k(G)} T_G(0,1-k).$$

=== Reliability polynomial ===
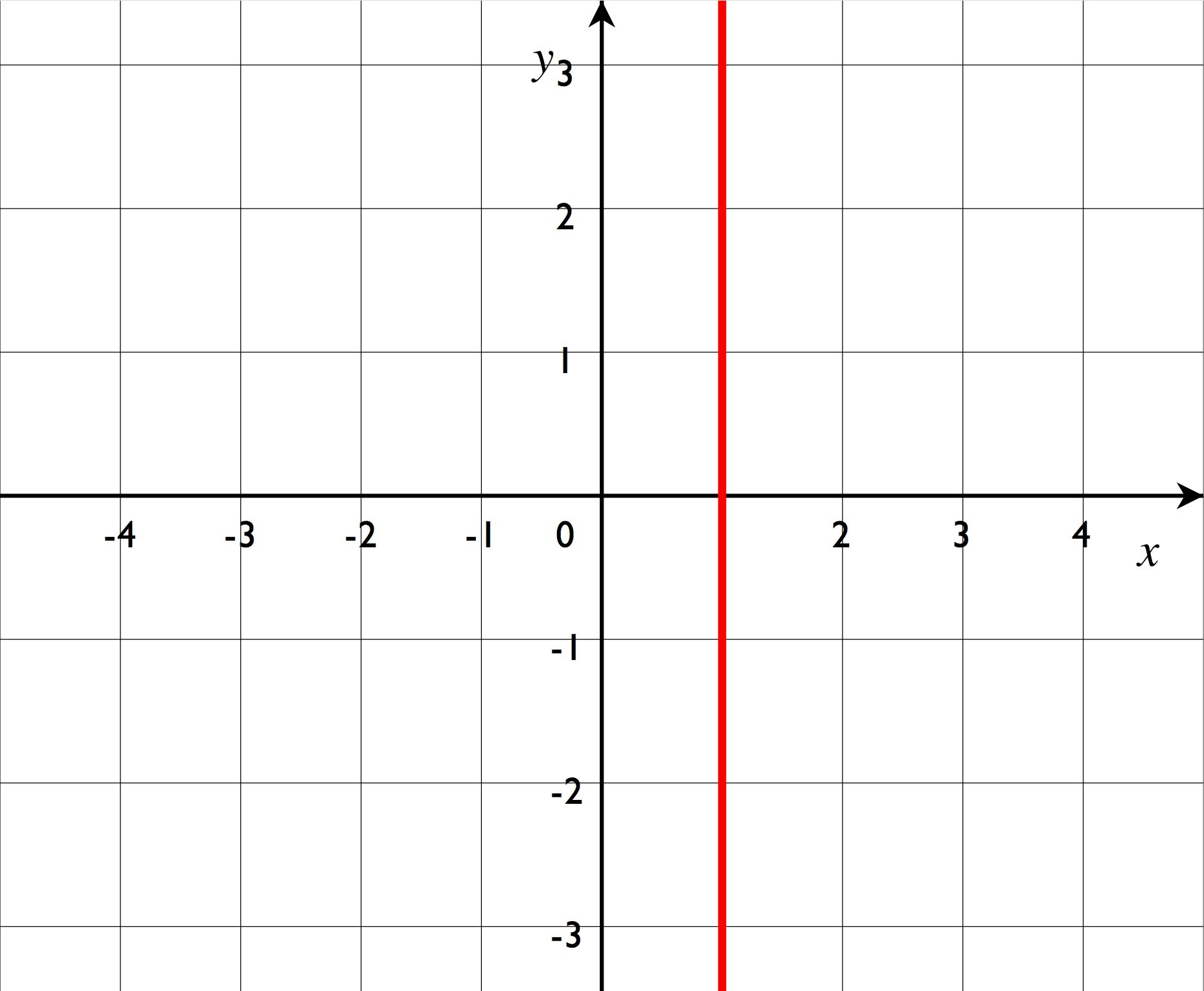
The reliability polynomial drawn in the Tutte plane

The all-terminal reliability polynomial studied in network theory can be recovered from the Tutte polynomial by evaluating at $x=1$. For a connected graph G remove every edge with probability p; this models a network subject to random edge failures. Then the reliability polynomial is a function $R_G(p)$, a polynomial in p, that gives the probability that every pair of vertices in G remains connected after the edges fail. The connection to the Tutte polynomial is given by

$$R_G(p) = (1-p)^{|V|-k(G)} p^{|E|-|V|+k(G)} T_G \left (1, \tfrac{1}{p} \right).$$

=== Dichromatic polynomial ===
Tutte also defined a closer 2-variable generalization of the chromatic polynomial, the dichromatic polynomial of a graph. This is

$$Q_G(u,v) = \sum\nolimits_{A \subseteq E} u^{k(A)} v^{|A|-|V|+k(A)},$$

where $k(A)$ is the number of connected components of the spanning subgraph (V,A). This is related to the corank-nullity polynomial by

$$Q_G(u,v) = u^{k(G)} \, R_G(u,v).$$

The dichromatic polynomial does not generalize to matroids because k(A) is not a matroid property: different graphs with the same matroid can have different numbers of connected components.

== Related polynomials ==
=== Martin polynomial ===
The Martin polynomial $m_{\vec{G}}(x)$ of an oriented 4-regular graph $\vec{G}$ was defined by Pierre Martin in 1977. He showed that if G is a plane graph and $\vec{G}_m$ is its directed medial graph, then

$$T_G(x,x) = m_{\vec{G}_m}(x).$$

== Algorithms ==
=== Deletion–contraction ===
The deletion–contraction algorithm applied to the diamond graph. Red edges are deleted in the left child and contracted in the right child. The resulting polynomial is the sum of the monomials at the leaves, $x^3+2x^2 +y^2+2xy+x+y$. Based on Welsh & Merino (2000).

The deletion–contraction recurrence for the Tutte polynomial,

$$T_G(x,y)= T_{G \setminus e}(x,y) + T_{G/e}(x,y), \qquad e \text{ not a loop nor a bridge.}$$

immediately yields a recursive algorithm for computing it for a given graph: as long as you can find an edge e that is not a loop or bridge, recursively compute the Tutte polynomial for when that edge is deleted, and when that edge is contracted. Then add the two sub-results together to get the overall Tutte polynomial for the graph.

The base case is a monomial $x^my^n$ where m is the number of bridges, and n is the number of loops.

Within a polynomial factor, the running time t of this algorithm can be expressed in terms of the number of vertices n and the number of edges m of the graph,

$$t(n+m)= t(n+m-1) + t(n+m-2),$$

a recurrence relation that scales as the Fibonacci numbers with solution

$$t(n+m)= \left (\frac{1+\sqrt{5}}{2} \right )^{n+m} = O \left (1.6180^{n+m} \right ).$$

The analysis can be improved to within a polynomial factor of the number $\tau(G)$ of spanning trees of the input graph. For sparse graphs with $m=O(n)$ this running time is $\exp(O(n))$. For regular graphs of degree k, the number of spanning trees can be bounded by

$$\tau(G) = O \left (\nu_k^n n^{-1} \log n \right ),$$

where

$$\nu_k = \frac{(k-1)^{k-1}}{(k^2-2k)^{\frac{k}{2}-1}}.$$

so the deletion–contraction algorithm runs within a polynomial factor of this bound. For example:

$$\nu_5 \approx 4.4066.$$

In practice, graph isomorphism testing is used to avoid some recursive calls. This approach works well for graphs that are quite sparse and exhibit many symmetries; the performance of the algorithm depends on the heuristic used to pick the edge e.

=== Gaussian elimination ===
In some restricted instances, the Tutte polynomial can be computed in polynomial time, ultimately because Gaussian elimination efficiently computes the matrix operations determinant and Pfaffian. These algorithms are themselves important results from algebraic graph theory and statistical mechanics.

$T_G(1,1)$ equals the number $\tau(G)$ of spanning trees of a connected graph. This is computable in polynomial time as the determinant of a maximal principal submatrix of the Laplacian matrix of G, an early result in algebraic graph theory known as Kirchhoff’s Matrix–Tree theorem. Likewise, the dimension of the bicycle space at $T_G(-1,-1)$ can be computed in polynomial time by Gaussian elimination.

For planar graphs, the partition function of the Ising model, i.e., the Tutte polynomial at the hyperbola $H_2$, can be expressed as a Pfaffian and computed efficiently via the FKT algorithm. This idea was developed by Fisher, Kasteleyn, and Temperley to compute the number of dimer covers of a planar lattice model.

=== Markov chain Monte Carlo ===
Using a Markov chain Monte Carlo method, the Tutte polynomial can be arbitrarily well approximated along the positive branch of $H_2$, equivalently, the partition function of the ferromagnetic Ising model. This exploits the close connection between the Ising model and the problem of counting matchings in a graph. The idea behind this celebrated result of Jerrum and Sinclair is to set up a Markov chain whose states are the matchings of the input graph. The transitions are defined by choosing edges at random and modifying the matching accordingly. The resulting Markov chain is rapidly mixing and leads to “sufficiently random” matchings, which can be used to recover the partition function using random sampling. The resulting algorithm is a fully polynomial-time randomized approximation scheme (fpras).

== Computational complexity ==
Several computational problems are associated with the Tutte polynomial. The most straightforward one is

Input: A graph $G$
Output: The coefficients of $T_G$

In particular, the output allows evaluating $T_G(-2,0)$ which is equivalent to counting the number of 3-colourings of G. This latter question is #P-complete, even when restricted to the family of planar graphs, so the problem of computing the coefficients of the Tutte polynomial for a given graph is #P-hard even for planar graphs.

Much more attention has been given to the family of problems called Tutte$(x,y)$ defined for every complex pair $(x,y)$:

Input: A graph $G$
Output: The value of $T_G(x,y)$

The hardness of these problems varies with the coordinates $(x,y)$.

=== Exact computation ===
The Tutte plane. Every point $(x,y)$ in the real plane corresponds to a computational problem $T_G(x,y)$. At any red point, the problem is polynomial-time computable; at any blue point, the problem is #P-hard in general, but polynomial-time computable for planar graphs; and at any point in the white regions, the problem is #P-hard even for bipartite planar graphs.

If both x and y are non-negative integers, the problem $T_G(x,y)$ belongs to #P. For general integer pairs, the Tutte polynomial contains negative terms, which places the problem in the complexity class GapP, the closure of #P under subtraction. To accommodate rational coordinates $(x,y)$, one can define a rational analogue of #P.

The computational complexity of exactly computing $T_G(x,y)$ falls into one of two classes for any $x, y \in \mathbb{C}$. The problem is #P-hard unless $(x,y)$ lies on the hyperbola $H_1$ or is one of the points

$$\left \{ (1,1), (-1,-1), (0,-1), (-1,0), (i,-i), (-i,i), \left(j,j^2 \right), \left(j^2,j \right) \right \}, \qquad j = e^{\frac{2 \pi i}{3}}.$$

in which cases it is computable in polynomial time. If the problem is restricted to the class of planar graphs, the points on the hyperbola $H_2$ become polynomial-time computable as well. All other points remain #P-hard, even for bipartite planar graphs. In his paper on the dichotomy for planar graphs, Vertigan claims (in his conclusion) that the same result holds when further restricted to graphs with vertex degree at most three, save for the point $T_G(0,-2)$, which counts nowhere-zero Z_{3}-flows and is computable in polynomial time.

These results contain several notable special cases. For example, the problem of computing the partition function of the Ising model is #P-hard in general, even though celebrated algorithms of Onsager and Fisher solve it for planar lattices. Also, the Jones polynomial is #P-hard to compute. Finally, computing the number of four-colorings of a planar graph is #P-complete, even though the decision problem is trivial by the four color theorem. In contrast, it is easy to see that counting the number of three-colorings for planar graphs is #P-complete because the decision problem is known to be NP-complete via a parsimonious reduction.

=== Approximation ===
The question of which points admit a good approximation algorithm has been very well studied. Apart from the points that can be computed exactly in polynomial time, the only approximation algorithm known for $T_G(x,y)$ is Jerrum and Sinclair’s FPRAS, which works for points on the “Ising” hyperbola $H_2$ for y > 0. If the input graphs are restricted to dense instances, with degree $\Omega(n)$, there is an FPRAS if x ≥ 1, y ≥ 1.

Even though the situation is not as well understood as for exact computation, large areas of the plane are known to be hard to approximate.

== See also ==
- Bollobás–Riordan polynomial
- A Tutte–Grothendieck invariant is any evaluation of the Tutte polynomial
