= Bollobás =

Bollobás is a Hungarian surname. Notable people with the surname include:

- Béla Bollobás (born 1943, Budapest), Hungarian-born British mathematician
- Enikő Bollobás (born 1952), Hungarian literary scholar

== See also ==
- Bollobás–Riordan polynomial
