= Bollobás–Riordan polynomial =

The Bollobás–Riordan polynomial can mean a 3-variable invariant polynomial of graphs on orientable surfaces, or a more general 4-variable invariant of ribbon graphs, generalizing the Tutte polynomial.

== History ==
These polynomials were discovered by Béla Bollobás and Oliver Riordan (2001, 2002).

== Formal definition ==
The 3-variable Bollobás–Riordan polynomial of a graph $G$ is given by

$$R_G(x,y,z) =\sum_F x^{r(G)-r(F)}y^{n(F)}z^{k(F)-bc(F)+n(F)}$$,

where the sum runs over all the spanning subgraphs $F$ and

- $v(G)$ is the number of vertices of $G$;
- $e(G)$ is the number of its edges of $G$;
- $k(G)$ is the number of components of $G$;
- $r(G)$ is the rank of $G$, such that $r(G) = v(G)- k(G)$;
- $n(G)$ is the nullity of $G$, such that $n(G) = e(G)-r(G)$;
- $bc(G)$ is the number of connected components of the boundary of $G$.

== See also ==
- Graph invariant
