= Haruo Hosoya =

Japanese chemist and emeritus professor

Haruo Hosoya (Japanese: 細矢 治夫, Hepburn: Hosoya Haruo; born 1936) is a Japanese chemist and emeritus professor of Ochanomizu University, Tokyo, Japan. He is the namesake of the Hosoya index used in discrete mathematics and computational chemistry.

== Early life ==
Hosoya was born in Kamakura, Japan to a family of an office worker. During 1955-1959 he studied at the University of Tokyo. In 1964 he wrote his Ph.D. thesis, "Study on the Structure of Reactive Intermediates and Reaction Mechanism".

== Career ==
After postdoc work abroad (Ann Arbor, Michigan, with prof. John Platt), in 1969 he became associate professor at the Ochanomizu University, where he worked for 33 years until his retirement in 2002. After retirement he has kept working in computational chemistry.

In 1971, Hosoya defined the topological index (a graph invariant) now known as the Hosoya index as the total number of matchings of a graph plus 1. The Hosoya index is often used in computer (mathematical) chemistry investigations for organic compounds.

In 2002-2003 the Internet Electronic Journal of Molecular Design dedicated a series of issues to commemorate the 65th birthday of professor Hosoya.

Hosoya's article "The Topological Index Z Before and After 1971" describes the history of the notion and the associated inside stories and details other Hosoya's achievements.

Hosoya also introduced the triangle of numbers known as Hosoya's triangle (originally "Fibonacci triangle", but that name can be ambiguous).
