= Matching polynomial =

Graph polynomial generating numbers of matchings

In the mathematical fields of graph theory and combinatorics, a matching polynomial (sometimes called an acyclic polynomial) is a generating function of the numbers of matchings of various sizes in a graph. It is one of several graph polynomials studied in algebraic graph theory.

== Definition ==
Several different types of matching polynomials have been defined. Let G be a graph with n vertices and let m_{k} be the number of k-edge matchings.

One matching polynomial of G is
$$m_G(x) := \sum_{k\geq0} m_k x^k.$$

Another definition gives the matching polynomial as
$$M_G(x) := \sum_{k\geq0} (-1)^k m_k x^{n-2k}.$$

A third definition is the polynomial
$$\mu_G(x,y) := \sum_{k\geq0} m_k x^k y^{n-2k}.$$

Each type has its uses, and all are equivalent by simple transformations. For instance,
$$M_G(x) = x^n m_G(-x^{-2})$$
and
$$\mu_G(x,y) = y^n m_G(x/y^2).$$

== Connections to other polynomials ==
The first type of matching polynomial is a direct generalization of the rook polynomial.

The second type of matching polynomial has remarkable connections with orthogonal polynomials. For instance, if G = K_{m,n}, the complete bipartite graph, then the second type of matching polynomial is related to the generalized Laguerre polynomial L_{n}^{α}(x) by the identity:

$$M_{K_{m,n}}(x) = n! L_n^{(m-n)}(x^2).$$

If G is the complete graph K_{n}, then M_{G}(x) is an Hermite polynomial:
$$M_{K_n}(x) = H_n(x),$$
where H_{n}(x) is the "probabilist's Hermite polynomial" (1) in the definition of Hermite polynomials. These facts were observed by Godsil (1981).

If G is a forest, then its matching polynomial is equal to the characteristic polynomial of its adjacency matrix.

If G is a path or a cycle, then M_{G}(x) is a Chebyshev polynomial. In this case μ_{G}(1,x) is a Fibonacci polynomial or Lucas polynomial respectively.

== Complementation ==
The matching polynomial of a graph G with n vertices is related to that of its complement by a pair of (equivalent) formulas. One of them is a simple combinatorial identity due to Zaslavsky (1981). The other is an integral identity due to Godsil (1981).

There is a similar relation for a subgraph G of K_{m,n} and its complement in K_{m,n}. This relation, due to Riordan (1958), was known in the context of non-attacking rook placements and rook polynomials.

== Applications in chemical informatics ==
The Hosoya index of a graph G, its number of matchings, is used in chemoinformatics as a structural descriptor of a molecular graph. It may be evaluated as m_{G}(1) (Gutman 1991).

The third type of matching polynomial was introduced by Farrell (1980) as a version of the "acyclic polynomial" used in chemistry.

== Computational complexity ==
On arbitrary graphs, or even planar graphs, computing the matching polynomial is #P-complete (Jerrum 1987). However, it can be computed more efficiently when additional structure about the graph is known. In particular, computing the matching polynomial on n-vertex graphs of treewidth k is fixed-parameter tractable: there exists an algorithm whose running time, for any fixed constant k, is a polynomial in n with an exponent that does not depend on k (Courcelle, Makowsky & Rotics 2001). The matching polynomial of a graph with n vertices and clique-width k may be computed in time n^{O(k)} (Makowsky et al. 2006).
