= Hosoya Station =

Hosoya Station is the name of two train stations in Japan:

- Hosoya Station (Gunma)
- Hosoya Station (Shizuoka)
