= Complete graph =

Graph in which every two vertices are adjacent

- K_{7}, a complete graph with 7 vertices
- Vertices: n
- Edges: $\textstyle\frac{n(n - 1)}{2}$
- Radius: $\left\{\begin{array}{ll}0 & n \le 1\\ 1 & \text{otherwise}\end{array}\right.$
- Diameter: $\left\{\begin{array}{ll}0 & n \le 1\\ 1 & \text{otherwise}\end{array}\right.$
- Girth: $\left\{\begin{array}{ll}\infty & n \le 2\\ 3 & \text{otherwise}\end{array}\right.$
- Automorphisms: n! (S_{n})
- Chromatic number: n
- Chromatic index: n if n is odd; n − 1 if n is even
- Spectrum: $\left\{\begin{array}{lll}\emptyset & n = 0\\ \left\{0^1\right\} & n = 1\\ \left\{(n - 1)^1, -1^{n - 1}\right\} & \text{otherwise}\end{array}\right.$
- Properties: (n − 1)-regular; Symmetric graph; Vertex-transitive; Edge-transitive; Strongly regular; Integral
- Notation: K_{n}

In the mathematical field of graph theory, a complete graph is a simple undirected graph in which every pair of distinct vertices is connected by a unique edge. A complete digraph is a directed graph in which every pair of distinct vertices is connected by a pair of unique edges (one in each direction).

Graph theory itself is typically dated as beginning with Leonhard Euler's 1736 work on the Seven Bridges of Königsberg. However, drawings of complete graphs, with their vertices placed on the points of a regular polygon, had already appeared in the 13th century, in the work of Ramon Llull. Such a drawing is sometimes referred to as a mystic rose.

== Properties ==
The complete graph on n vertices is denoted by K_{n}. Some sources claim that the letter K in this notation stands for the German word komplett, but the German name for a complete graph, vollständiger Graph, does not contain the letter K, and other sources state that the notation honors the contributions of Kazimierz Kuratowski to graph theory.

K_{n} has n(n − 1)/2 edges (a triangular number), and is a regular graph of degree n − 1. All complete graphs are their own maximal cliques. They are maximally connected as the only vertex cut which disconnects the graph is the complete set of vertices. The complement graph of a complete graph is an empty graph.

If the edges of a complete graph are each given an orientation, the resulting directed graph is called a tournament.

K_{n} can be decomposed into n trees T_{i} such that T_{i} has i vertices. Ringel's conjecture asks if the complete graph K_{2n+1} can be decomposed into copies of any tree with n edges. This is known to be true for sufficiently large n.

The number of all distinct paths between a specific pair of vertices in K_{n+2} is given by

$$w_{n+2} = n! e_n = \lfloor en!\rfloor,$$

where e refers to Euler's constant, and

$$e_n = \sum_{k=0}^n\frac{1}{k!}.$$

The number of matchings of the complete graphs are given by the telephone numbers

1, 1, 2, 4, 10, 26, 76, 232, 764, 2620, 9496, 35696, 140152, 568504, 2390480, 10349536, 46206736, ... (sequence A000085 in the OEIS).

These numbers give the largest possible value of the Hosoya index for an n-vertex graph. The number of perfect matchings of the complete graph K_{n} (with n even) is given by the double factorial (n − 1)!!.

The crossing numbers up to K_{27} are known, with K_{28} requiring either 7233 or 7234 crossings. Further values are collected by the Rectilinear Crossing Number project. Rectilinear Crossing numbers for K_{n} are

0, 0, 0, 0, 1, 3, 9, 19, 36, 62, 102, 153, 229, 324, 447, 603, 798, 1029, 1318, 1657, 2055, 2528, 3077, 3699, 4430, 5250, 6180, ... (sequence A014540 in the OEIS).

== Geometry and topology ==
Interactive Csaszar polyhedron model with vertices representing nodes. In the SVG image, move the mouse to rotate it.

A complete graph with n nodes is the edge graph of an (n − 1)-dimensional simplex. Geometrically K_{3} forms the edge set of a triangle, K_{4} a tetrahedron, etc. The Császár polyhedron, a nonconvex polyhedron with the topology of a torus, has the complete graph K_{7} as its skeleton. Every neighborly polytope in four or more dimensions also has a complete skeleton.

K_{1} through K_{4} are all planar graphs. However, every planar drawing of a complete graph with five or more vertices must contain a crossing, and the nonplanar complete graph K_{5} plays a key role in the characterizations of planar graphs: by Kuratowski's theorem, a graph is planar if and only if it contains neither K_{5} nor the complete bipartite graph K_{3,3} as a subdivision, and by Wagner's theorem the same result holds for graph minors in place of subdivisions. As part of the Petersen family, K_{6} plays a similar role as one of the forbidden minors for linkless embedding. In other words, and as Conway and Gordon proved, every embedding of K_{6} into three-dimensional space is intrinsically linked, with at least one pair of linked triangles. Conway and Gordon also showed that any three-dimensional embedding of K_{7} contains a Hamiltonian cycle that is embedded in space as a nontrivial knot.

== Examples ==
Complete graphs on $n$ vertices, for $n$ between 1 and 12, are shown below along with the numbers of edges:

K_{1}: 0	K_{2}: 1	K_{3}: 3	K_{4}: 6
K_{5}: 10	K_{6}: 15	K_{7}: 21	K_{8}: 28
K_{9}: 36	K_{10}: 45	K_{11}: 55	K_{12}: 66

== See also ==
- Fully connected network, in computer networking
- Complete bipartite graph (or biclique), a special bipartite graph where every vertex on one side of the bipartition is connected to every vertex on the other side
- The simplex, which is identical to a complete graph of $n+1$ vertices, where $n$ is the dimension of the simplex.
