= Dinitz =

Dinitz is a surname. Notable people with this surname include:

- Jeff Dinitz (born 1952), American mathematician
- Simcha Dinitz (1929–2003), Israeli statesman and politician
- Yefim Dinitz, Soviet and Israeli computer scientist

== See also ==
- Dinitz theorem about partial Latin squares, made by Jeff Dinitz
- Dinitz-Garg-Goemans conjecture, disproven conjecture in network flow theory
- Dinic's algorithm for finding the maximal flow through a network, invented by Yefim Dinitz
- United States v. Dinitz, a US Supreme Court case involving double jeopardy
