= Jeannette Janssen =

Dutch and Canadian mathematician

Jeannette Catharina Maria Janssen is a Dutch and Canadian mathematician whose research concerns graph theory and the theory of complex networks. She is a professor of mathematics at Dalhousie University, the chair of the Dalhousie Department of Mathematics and Statistics, and the chair of the Activity Group on Discrete Mathematics of the Society for Industrial and Applied Mathematics.

== Education and career ==
Janssen earned a master's degree at the Eindhoven University of Technology in 1988. She completed her Ph.D. at Lehigh University in 1993. Her dissertation, Even and Odd Latin Squares, concerned Latin squares and was supervised by Edward F. Assmus Jr.

From 1988 to 1990 Janssen was a lecturer at the Universidad de Guanajuato in Mexico. After completing her Ph.D., she became a postdoctoral researcher jointly at the Laboratoire de Combinatoire et d’Informatique Mathématique of Université du Québec à Montréal and at Concordia University. She took a position as a lecturer and research associate at the London School of Economics in 1995, and moved to Acadia University in 1997 before taking her present position at Dalhousie University.

At Dalhousie, she was named department chair in 2016, becoming the first female chair of the mathematics department.

== Service ==
Janssen directed the Atlantic Association for Research in the Mathematical Sciences from 2011 to 2016, and chairs its board of directors. She was elected as chair of the Activity Group on Discrete Mathematics (SIAG-DM) of the Society for Industrial and Applied Mathematics (SIAM) for the 2021–2022 term.

== Research ==
In a 1993 paper, Janssen solved the unbalanced case of the Dinitz conjecture, showing that any partial Latin rectangle could be extended to a full rectangle. The problem is equivalent to list edge-coloring of complete bipartite graphs, and her solution was based on earlier work on list coloring by Noga Alon and Michael Tarsi. Janssen's work "surprised even many of the experts", and was considered to be "great progress" on the Dinitz conjecture. The remaining case of the conjecture for squares (balanced complete bipartite graphs) was proven a year later by Fred Galvin.
