= Shannon multigraph =

Three-vertex regular multigraph

In the mathematical discipline of graph theory, Shannon multigraphs, named after Claude Shannon by Vizing (1965), are a special type of triangle graphs, which are used in the field of edge coloring in particular.

A Shannon multigraph is multigraph with 3 vertices for which either of the following conditions holds:
- a) all 3 vertices are connected by the same number of edges.
- b) as in a) and one additional edge is added.

More precisely one speaks of Shannon multigraph Sh(n), if the three vertices are connected by $\left\lfloor \frac{n}{2} \right\rfloor$, $\left\lfloor \frac{n}{2} \right\rfloor$ and $\left\lfloor \frac{n+1}{2} \right\rfloor$ edges respectively. This multigraph has maximum degree n. Its multiplicity (the maximum number of edges in a set of edges that all have the same endpoints) is $\left\lfloor \frac{n+1}{2} \right\rfloor$.

== Examples ==
Shannon multigraphs

Sh(2)

Sh(3)

Sh(4)

Sh(5)

Sh(6)

Sh(7)

== Edge coloring ==
This nine-edge Shannon multigraph requires nine colors in any edge coloring; its vertex degree is six and its multiplicity is three.

According to a theorem of Shannon (1949), every multigraph with maximum degree $\Delta$ has an edge coloring that uses at most $\frac32\Delta$ colors. When $\Delta$ is even, the example of the Shannon multigraph with multiplicity $\Delta/2$ shows that this bound is tight: the vertex degree is exactly $\Delta$, but each of the $\frac32\Delta$ edges is adjacent to every other edge, so it requires $\frac32\Delta$ colors in any proper edge coloring.

A version of Vizing's theorem states that every multigraph with maximum degree $\Delta$ and multiplicity $\mu$ may be colored using at most $\Delta+\mu$ colors. Again, this bound is tight for the Shannon multigraphs.
