= Equitable coloring =

Graph coloring with equal color classes

In graph theory, an area of mathematics, an equitable coloring is an assignment of colors to the vertices of an undirected graph, in such a way that

- No two adjacent vertices have the same color, and
- The numbers of vertices in any two color classes differ by at most one.

That is, the partition of vertices among the different colors is as uniform as possible. For instance, giving each vertex a distinct color would be equitable, but would typically use many more colors than are necessary in an optimal equitable coloring. An equivalent way of defining an equitable coloring is that it is an embedding of the given graph as a subgraph of a Turán graph with the same set of vertices. There are two kinds of chromatic number associated with equitable coloring. The equitable chromatic number of a graph G is the smallest number k such that G has an equitable coloring with k colors. But G might not have equitable colorings for some larger numbers of colors; the equitable chromatic threshold of G is the smallest k such that G has equitable colorings for any number of colors greater than or equal to k.

The Hajnal–Szemerédi theorem, posed as a conjecture by Paul Erdős (1964) and proven by András Hajnal and Endre Szemerédi (1970), states that any graph with maximum degree Δ has an equitable coloring with Δ + 1 colors. Several related conjectures remain open. Polynomial time algorithms are also known for finding a coloring matching this bound, and for finding optimal colorings of special classes of graphs, but the more general problem of deciding whether an arbitrary graph has an equitable coloring with a given number of colors is NP-complete.

== Examples ==
An equitable coloring of the star K_{1,5}.

The star K_{1,5} - a single central vertex connected to five others - is a complete bipartite graph, and therefore may be colored with two colors. However, the resulting coloring has one vertex in one color class and five in another, and is therefore not equitable. The smallest number of colors in an equitable coloring of this graph is four: the central vertex must be the only vertex in its color class, so the other five vertices must be split among at least three color classes in order to ensure that the other color classes all have at most two vertices.

More generally, Meyer (1973) observes that any star K_{1,n} needs $\scriptstyle 1+\lceil n/2\rceil$ colors in any equitable coloring; thus, the chromatic number of a graph may differ from its equitable coloring number by a factor as large as n/4. Because K_{1,5} has maximum degree five, the number of colors guaranteed for it by the Hajnal–Szemerédi theorem is six, achieved by giving each vertex a distinct color.

Another interesting phenomenon is exhibited by a different complete bipartite graph, K_{2n + 1,2n + 1}. This graph has an equitable 2-coloring, given by its bipartition. However, it does not have an equitable (2n + 1)-coloring: any equitable partition of the vertices into that many color classes would have to have exactly two vertices per class, but the two sides of the bipartition cannot each be partitioned into pairs because they have an odd number of vertices. Therefore, the equitable chromatic threshold of this graph is 2n + 2, significantly greater than its equitable chromatic number of two.

== Hajnal–Szemerédi theorem ==
Brooks' theorem states that any connected graph with maximum degree Δ has a Δ-coloring, with two exceptions (complete graphs and odd cycles). However, this coloring may in general be far from equitable. Paul Erdős (1964) conjectured that an equitable coloring is possible with only one more color: any graph with maximum degree Δ has an equitable coloring with Δ + 1 colors. The case Δ = 2 is straightforward (any union of paths and cycles may be equitably colored by using a repeated pattern of three colors, with minor adjustments to the repetition when closing a cycle) and the case Δ + 1= n/3 had previously been solved by Corrádi & Hajnal (1963). The full conjecture was proven by Hajnal & Szemerédi (1970), and is now known as the Hajnal–Szemerédi theorem. Their original proof was long and complicated; a simpler proof was given by Kierstead & Kostochka (2008). A polynomial time algorithm for finding equitable colorings with this many colors was described by Kierstead and Alexandr Kostochka; they credit Marcelo Mydlarz and Endre Szemerédi with a prior unpublished polynomial time algorithm. Kierstead and Kostochka also announce but do not prove a strengthening of the theorem, to show that an equitable k+1-coloring exists whenever every two adjacent vertices have degrees adding to at most 2k + 1.

Meyer (1973) conjectured a form of Brooks' theorem for equitable coloring: every connected graph with maximum degree Δ has an equitable coloring with Δ or fewer colors, with the exceptions of complete graphs and odd cycles. A strengthened version of the conjecture states that each such graph has an equitable coloring with exactly Δ colors, with one additional exception, a complete bipartite graph in which both sides of the bipartition have the same odd number of vertices.

Seymour (1974) proposed a strengthening of the Hajnal–Szemerédi theorem that also subsumes Dirac's theorem that dense graphs are Hamiltonian: he conjectured that, if every vertex in an n-vertex graph has at least kn/(k + 1) neighbors, then the graph contains as a subgraph the graph formed by connecting vertices that are at most k steps apart in an n-cycle. The case k = 1 is Dirac's theorem itself. The Hajnal–Szemerédi theorem may be recovered from this conjecture by applying the conjecture for larger values of k to the complement graph of a given graph, and using as color classes contiguous subsequences of vertices from the n-cycle. Seymour's conjecture has been approximately proven, i.e. for graphs where every vertex has at least kn/(k + 1)+o(n) neighbors. The proof uses several deep tools including the Hajnal–Szemerédi theorem itself.

Yet another generalization of the Hajnal–Szemerédi theorem is the Bollobás–Eldridge–Catlin conjecture (or BEC-conjecture for short). This states that if G_{1} and G_{2} are graphs on n vertices with maximum degree Δ_{1} and Δ_{2} respectively, and if (Δ_{1} + 1)(Δ_{2} + 1) ≤ n+1, then G_{1} and G_{2} can be packed. That is, G_{1} and G_{2} can be represented on the same set of n vertices with no edges in common. The Hajnal–Szemerédi theorem is the special case of this conjecture in which G_{2} is a disjoint union of cliques. Catlin (1974) provides a similar but stronger condition on Δ_{1} and Δ_{2} under which such a packing can be guaranteed to exist.

== Special classes of graphs ==
For any tree with maximum degree Δ, the equitable chromatic number is at most

$1+\lceil\Delta/2\rceil$

with the worst case occurring for a star. However, most trees have significantly smaller equitable chromatic number: if a tree with n vertices has Δ ≤ n/3 − O(1), then it has an equitable coloring with only three colors. Furmańczyk (2006) studies the equitable chromatic number of graph products.

== Computational complexity ==
The problem of finding equitable colorings with as few colors as possible (below the Hajnal-Szemerédi bound) has also been studied. A straightforward reduction from graph coloring to equitable coloring may be proven by adding sufficiently many isolated vertices to a graph, showing that it is NP-complete to test whether a graph has an equitable coloring with a given number of colors (greater than two). However, the problem becomes more interesting when restricted to special classes of graphs or from the point of view of parameterized complexity. Bodlaender & Fomin (2005) showed that, given a graph G and a number c of colors, it is possible to test whether G admits an equitable c-coloring in time O(n^{O(t)}), where t is the treewidth of G; in particular, equitable coloring may be solved optimally in polynomial time for trees (previously known due to Chen & Lih 1994) and outerplanar graphs. A polynomial time algorithm is also known for equitable coloring of split graphs. However, Fellows et al. (2007) prove that, when the treewidth is a parameter to the algorithm, the problem is W[1]-hard. Thus, it is unlikely that there exists a polynomial time algorithm independent of this parameter, or even that the dependence on the parameter may be moved out of the exponent in the formula for the running time.

== Applications ==
One motivation for equitable coloring suggested by Meyer (1973) concerns scheduling problems. In this application, the vertices of a graph represent a collection of tasks to be performed, and an edge connects two tasks that should not be performed at the same time. A coloring of this graph represents a partition of the tasks into subsets that may be performed simultaneously; thus, the number of colors in the coloring corresponds to the number of time steps required to perform the entire task. Due to load balancing considerations, it is desirable to perform equal or nearly-equal numbers of tasks in each time step, and this balancing is exactly what an equitable coloring achieves. Furmańczyk (2006) mentions a specific application of this type of scheduling problem, assigning university courses to time slots in a way that spreads the courses evenly among the available time slots and avoids scheduling incompatible pairs of courses at the same time as each other.

The Hajnal-Szemerédi theorem has also been used to bound the variance of sums of random variables with limited dependence (Pemmaraju 2001; Janson & Ruciński 2002). If (as in the setup for the Lovász local lemma) each variable depends on at most Δ others, an equitable coloring of the dependence graph may be used to partition the variables into independent subsets within which Chernoff bounds may be calculated, resulting in tighter overall bounds on the variance than if the partition were performed in a non-equitable way.
