= Mehdi Behzad =

Iranian mathematician (born 1936)

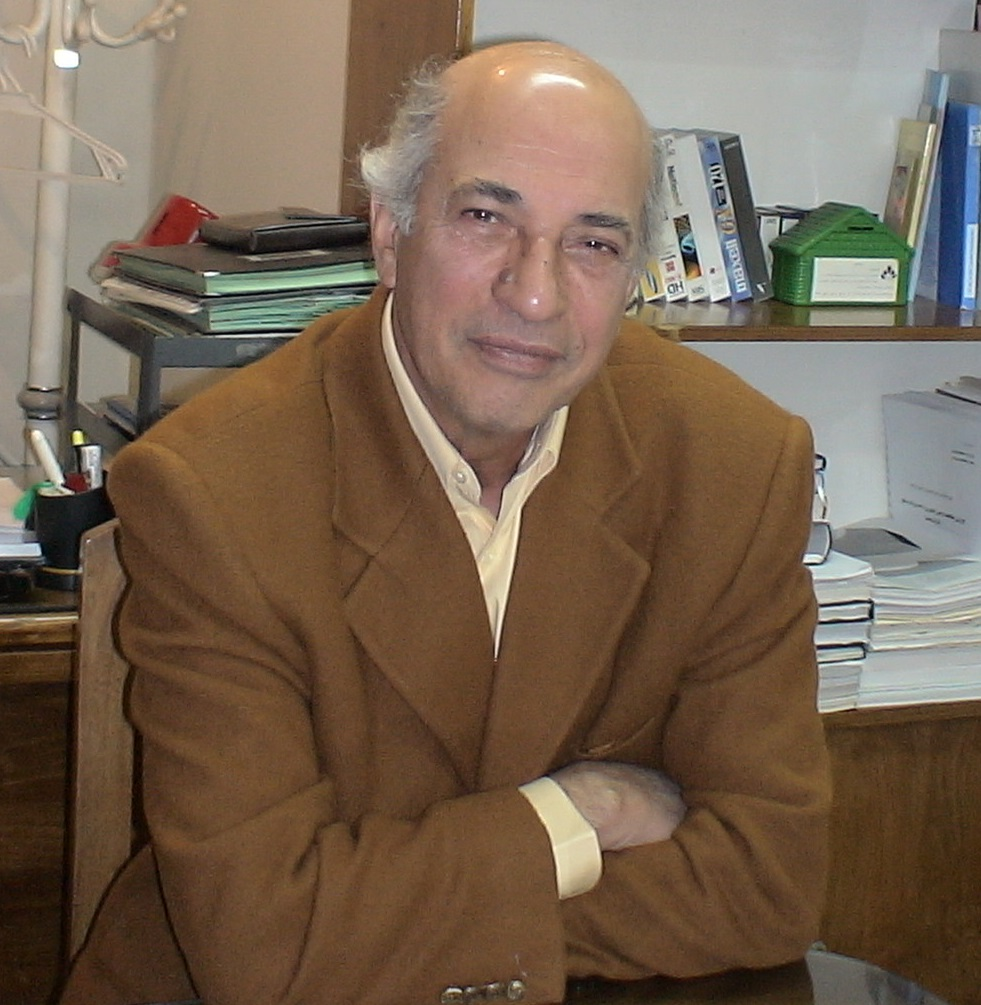
- Born: April 22, 1936 (age 90); Iran
- Education: Michigan State University
- Known for: Total Chromatic Number Conjecture
- Scientific career
- Fields: Mathematics, Graph Theory
- Thesis: Graphs and their Chromatic Numbers (1965)

Mehdi Behzad (Persian:مهدی بهزاد; born April 22, 1936) is an Iranian mathematician specializing in graph theory. He introduced his total coloring theory (also known as "Behzad's conjecture" or "the total chromatic number conjecture") during his Ph.D. studies in 1965. Despite the active work during the last 50 years this conjecture remains as challenging as it is open. In fact, Behzad's conjecture now belongs to mathematics’ classic open problems.

Behzad has been instrumental in institutionalizing mathematics education and popularization of mathematics in Iran, and has received numerous awards and recognition for his lifetime service to the Iranian scientific community.

== Graph theory ==
Behzad is the coauthor of two text books on graph theory published in 1972 and 1979 in the U.S., which were among the key references on this new field of mathematics. He has been one of the direct collaborators of Paul Erdős.

== Professorship ==
Behzad was the first faculty member of Sharif University of Technology (Persian:دانشگاه صنعتی شریف), formerly Arya-Mehr University of Technology (Persian: دانشگاه صنعتی آریامهر), who was promoted to full professor in this institution. He was a Senior Fulbright Scholar at Michigan State University and Massachusetts Institute of Technology (MIT) in the academic year 1974–75, where his research was supported by U.S. National Academy of Sciences. He has taught courses in several universities in the United States and Iran. Although in 1981, he decided to "retire" as a university professor at the age of 45, he has continued to serve the Iranian scientific community in different capacities.

== Institutionalizing of basic sciences ==
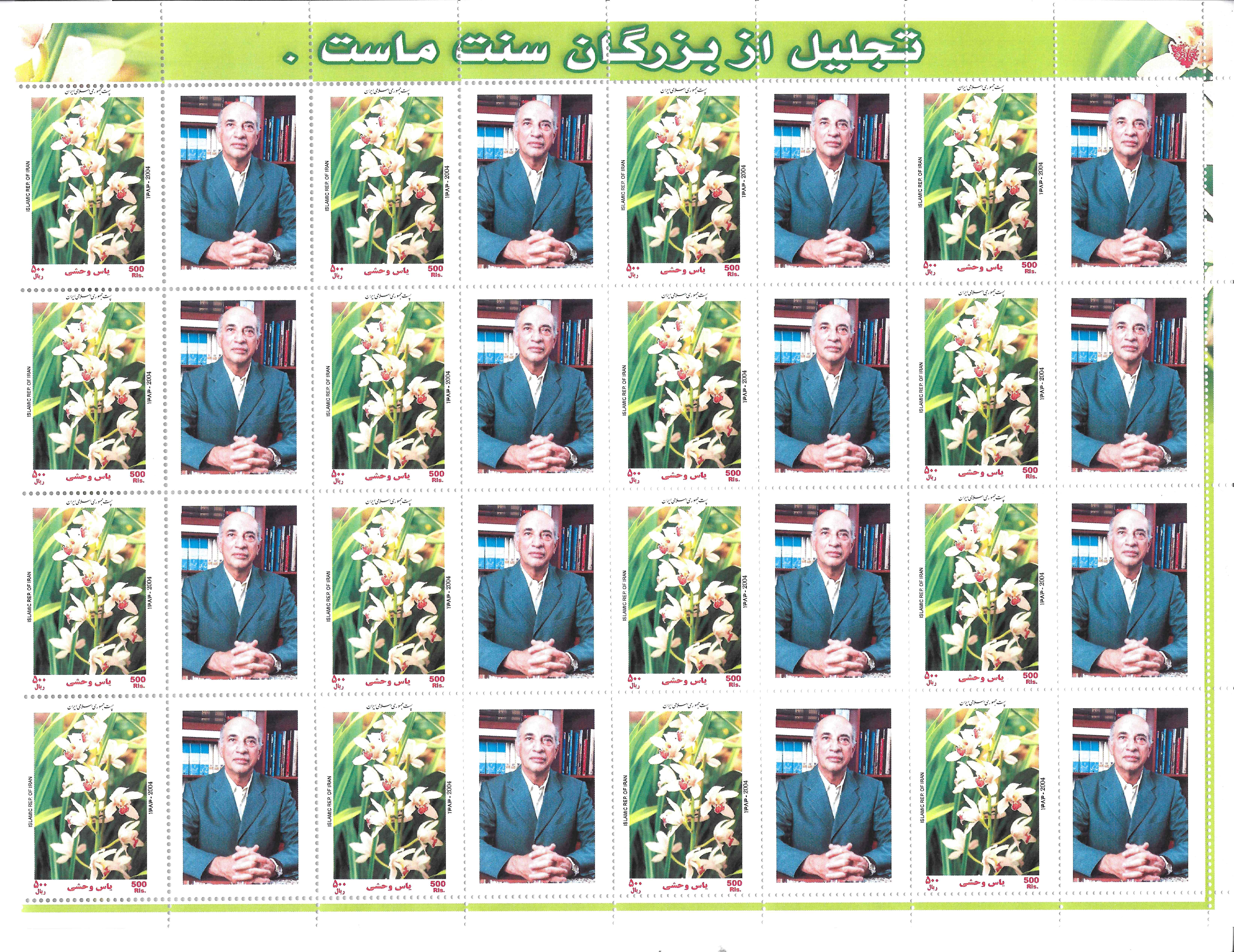
Behzad featured on postage stamps by Iran Post Company, 2004

Behzad has played an important role in institutionalizing and advancement of basic sciences in his home country of Iran. In recognition of his executive contributions during his lifetime, the Iranian Mathematical Society (Persian: انجمن‌ رياضى‌ ‌اير‌ان‌) has established the Dr. Mehdi Behzad's Award (Persian: جایزه‌ی دکتر مهدی بهزاد), an annual multinational award for recognition of individuals with outstanding leadership role in advancement of mathematics in their respective countries.

Behzad's executive contributions include:

- A founding member and the first secretary general of Iranian Academy of Sciences, referred to as Imperial Iranian Academy of Sciences, (Persian: فرهنگستان شاهنشاهی علوم ایران) before Iran's revolution, consisting of internationally renowned Iranian elites in the fields of Basic Sciences, Engineering, Medicine, Agriculture, and Liberal Arts and Anthropology, 1975–1979.
- A founding member and the first president of Iranian Mathematical Society (IMS) (Persian: انجمن‌ رياضى‌ ‌اير‌ان‌), the first registered scientific society in Iran and arguably one of the most active ones. He led IMS as its president from 1971 to 1973 and later on from 1997 to 2003 for two additional terms.
- A founding member of Foundation for Advancement of Science and Technology in Iran (Persian: بنياد بيشبرد علم و فن ﺁورى در ايران).
- A founding member of Council for Iranian Scientific Societies (Persian: شوراى انجمن هاى علمي ايران).
- A founding member and vice chancellor at Reza Shah-e-Kabir University (Persian: دانشكاه رضاشاه كبير) since inception in 1976 till 1979. This was the first university in Iran, and arguably in the Middle East, which admitted Ph.D. students in the fields of mathematics, physics, chemistry, and anthropology. Despite the extensive planning and collaboration with Harvard University, the ambitious goals of this institution was never achieved due to the post-revolutionary circumstances in the country.
- Chairman at School of Mathematical Sciences at Arya-Mehr University of Technology (Persian: دانشگاه صنعتی آریامهر), currently Sharif University of Technology (Persian: دانشگاه صنعتی شریف) from 1971 to 1973.
- A member of the Academy of Sciences of Islamic Republic of Iran (Persian: فرهنگستان علوم جمهورى اسلامى ایران) since 2002.

== Popularization of mathematics ==
Behzad's contributions to popularization of mathematics in Iranian scientific community include:

- A founding member of Iranian Society for Popularization of Sciences (Persian: انجمن تروىج علم ايران).
- A founding member of Council for Mathematics Houses of Iran (Persian: شوراى خانه هاى رىاضيات ايران).
- Award-winning translation of two calculus text books into Persian (جاىزه كتاب سال دانشكاه تهران و جاىزه كتاب سال جمهورى اسلامى ايران). Both books are currently taught nationwide in Iranian universities.
- Coauthor of a text book, entitled Pre-University Discrete Mathematics (Persian: رياضيات كسسته بيش دانشكاهى), currently taught in Iranian high schools nationwide.
- Coauthor of a play script entitled, The Legend of the King and the Mathematician - Helping Youth Create Mathematics, a book endorsed by the Iranian National Commission for UNESCO as a work which brings together “the art of play-writing, traditional and indigenous culture and the science of Mathematics”.

== Awards and recognitions ==
Behzad has been interviewed repeatedly by the national TV, radio, and newspapers. He has received numerous awards and recognition for his contributions such as:

- Nationally honored as Prominent Figure of Mathematics in Iran, (Persian: جهره ماندكار رياضيات كشور).
- Recipient of the national Alame Tabatabyi Award (Persian: جايزه علامه طباطبايى) as the Outstanding Professor of National Elite Foundation (Persian: استاد برجسته بنياد ملى نخبكان) in 2011.
- ...needs to be completed...

== Books ==
- M. Behzad and G. Chartrand, Introduction to the Theory of Graphs, Allyn and Bacon, 1971, 271 pages.
- M. Behzad, G. Chartrand, and L. Lesniak, Graphs & Digraphs, Wadsworth, Inc., 1979, 406 pages.
- M. Behzad, Graphs and Their Chromatic Numbers, Michigan State University, Department of Mathematics, 1965, 124 pages.
