= Fred Galvin =

American mathematician

Frederick William Galvin is a mathematician, currently a professor at the University of Kansas. His research interests include set theory and combinatorics.

His notable combinatorial work includes the proof of the Dinitz theorem. In set theory, he proved with András Hajnal that if ℵ_{ω_{1}} is a strong limit cardinal, then

$$2^{\aleph_{\omega_1}}<\aleph_{(2^{\aleph_1})^+}$$

holds. The research on extending this result led Saharon Shelah to the invention of PCF theory. Galvin gave an elementary proof of the Baumgartner–Hajnal theorem $\omega_1\to(\alpha)^2_k$ ($\alpha<\omega_1, k<\omega$). The original proof by Baumgartner and Hajnal used forcing and absoluteness. Galvin and Shelah also proved the square bracket partition relations $\aleph_1\not\to[\aleph_1]^2_4$ and $2^{\aleph_0}\not\to[2^{\aleph_0}]^2_{\aleph_0}$. Galvin also proved the partition relation $\eta\to[\eta]^2_3$ where η denotes the order type of the set of rational numbers. Galvin and Karel Prikry proved that every Borel set is Ramsey. Galvin and Komjáth showed that the axiom of choice is equivalent to the statement that every graph has a chromatic number.

Galvin received his Ph.D. in 1967 from the University of Minnesota.

He also invented Marseillais chess in 1957 (already published by others earlier in 1925), and Push Chess in 1967.
