= Jeff Dinitz =

American mathematician

- Born: 1952 (age 73–74); Brooklyn, New York, US
- Education: Carnegie Mellon University, Ohio State University
- Known for: Dinitz conjecture
- Children: 3
- Scientific career
- Fields: Mathematics, Combinatorics
- Workplaces: University of Vermont
- Doctoral advisor: R. M. Wilson

Jeffrey Howard Dinitz (born 1952) is an American mathematician who taught combinatorics at the University of Vermont. He is best known for proposing the Dinitz conjecture, which became a major theorem.

== Early life and education ==
Dinitz was born in 1952 in Brooklyn, New York City, New York.

== XFL scheduling ==
Dinitz is also well known for scheduling the first season of the now-defunct XFL football league. He and a colleague from the Czech Republic, Dalibor Froncek, offered the then-brand-new XFL league their expertise to draft complicated schedules.

The XFL administration quickly agreed, which "surprised" Dinitz greatly. After some time on the computer, Dinitz and Froncek sent the XFL a draft schedule, and the new league gratefully accepted. Although the XFL folded after only one season, Dinitz was happy that "(he and Froncek) got to go to the championship game in Los Angeles".

== Personal life ==
Dinitz is married to Susan Dinitz and has three children.

== Bibliography ==
- Handbook of Combinatorial Designs, Second Edition by Charles J. Colbourn and Jeffrey H. Dinitz, 2006
- CRC Handbook of Combinatorial Designs by Charles J. Colbourn and Jeffrey H. Dinitz, 1996
- Contemporary Design Theory: A Collection of Surveys by Jeffrey H. Dinitz and Douglas R. Stinson, 1992
