= List of graphs by edges and vertices =

This sortable list points to the articles describing various individual (finite) graphs. The columns 'vertices', 'edges', 'radius', 'diameter', 'girth', 'P' (whether the graph is planar), χ (chromatic number) and χ' (chromatic index) are also sortable, allowing searching for a parameter. In the planarity column, T indicates that the graph is planar and F indicates that the graph is not planar.

See also Graph theory for the general theory, as well as Gallery of named graphs for a list with illustrations.

== List ==
name	vertices	edges	radius	diam.	girth	P	χ	χ'
120-cell	600	1200	15	15	5	F	3	4
Balaban 3-10-cage	70	105	6	6	10	F	2	3
Balaban 3-11-cage	112	168	6	8	11	F	3	3
Barnette–Bosák–Lederberg graph	38	57	5	9	4	T	3	3
Bidiakis cube	12	18	3	3	4	T	3	3
Biggs–Smith graph	102	153	7	7	9	F	3	3
Blanuša snarks	18	27	4	4	5	F	3	4
Brinkmann graph	21	42	3	3	5	T	4	5
Brouwer–Haemers graph	81	810	2	2	3	F	7	21
Bull graph	5	5	2	3	3	T	3	3
Butterfly graph	5	6	1	2	3	T	3	4
Cameron graph	231	3465	2	2	3	F	N/A	N/A
Chang graphs	28	168	2	2	3	F	7	12
Chvátal graph	12	24	2	2	4	F	4	4
Clebsch graph	16	40	2	2	4	F	4	5
Coxeter graph	28	42	4	4	7	F	3	3
Cubical graph	8	12	3	3	4	T	2	3
Cuboctahedral graph	12	24	3	3	3	T	3	4
Dejter graph	112	336	7	7	6	F	2	6
Desargues graph	20	30	5	5	6	F	2	3
Descartes snark	210	315	N/A	N/A	5	N/A	N/A	4
Diamond graph	4	5	1	2	3	T	3	3
Dodecahedral graph (20-fullerene)	20	30	5	5	5	T	3	3
Double-star snark	30	45	4	4	6	F	3	4
Dürer graph	12	18	3	4	3	T	3	3
Dyck graph	32	48	5	5	6	F	2	3
Ellingham–Horton 54-graph	54	81	9	10	6	F	2	3
Ellingham–Horton 78-graph	78	117	7	13	6	F	2	3
Errera graph	17	45	3	4	3	T	4	6
F26A graph	26	39	5	5	6	F	2	3
Flower snark J(5)	20	30	4	4	5	F	3	4
Folkman graph	20	40	3	4	4	F	2	4
Foster 5-5-cage	30	75	3	3	5	F	4	5
Foster graph	90	135	8	8	10	F	2	3
Franklin graph	12	18	3	3	4	F	2	3
Fritsch graph	9	21	2	2	3	T	4	6
Frucht graph	12	18	3	4	3	T	3	3
Gewirtz graph	56	280	2	2	4	F	4	10
26-fullerene graph (26-fullerene)	26	39	5	6	5	T	3	3
Goldner–Harary graph	11	27	2	2	3	T	4	8
Golomb graph	10	18	2	3	3	T	4	6
Gosset graph	56	756	3	3	3	F	14	27
Gray graph	54	81	6	6	8	F	2	3
Grötzsch graph	11	20	2	2	4	F	4	5
Hall–Janko graph	100	1800	2	2	3	F	10	36
Harborth graph	52	104	6	9	3	T	3	4
Harries graph	70	105	6	6	10	F	2	3
Harries–Wong graph	70	105	6	6	10	F	2	3
Heawood 3-6-cage graph	14	21	3	3	6	F	2	3
Herschel graph	11	18	3	4	4	T	2	4
Hexagonal truncated trapezohedron (24-fullerene)	24	36	5	5	5	T	3	3
Higman–Sims graph	100	1100	2	2	4	F	6	22
Hoffman graph	16	32	3	4	4	F	2	4
Hoffman–Singleton 7-5-cage graph	50	175	2	2	5	F	4	7
Hofman Graph H(6,2)	90	180	14	14	4	F	3	?
Hofman Graph H(12,4)	180	360	17	17	4	F	3	?
Hofman Graph H(18,6)	270	540	20	20	4	F	3	?
Holt graph	27	54	3	3	5	F	3	5
Horton graph	96	144	10	10	6	F	2	3
Icosahedral graph	12	30	3	3	3	T	4	5
Icosidodecahedral graph	30	60	5	5	3	T	3	4
Iofinova-Ivanov-110-vertex graph	110	165	7	7	10	F	2	3
Kittell graph	23	63	3	4	3	T	4	7
Klein graph (cubic)	56	84	6	6	7	F	3	3
Klein graph (7-valent)	24	84	3	3	3	F	4	7
Krackhardt kite graph	10	18	2	4	3	T	4	6
Livingstone graph	266	1463	4	4	5	F	N/A	11
Ljubljana graph	112	168	7	8	10	F	2	3
Loupekine snark (first)	22	33	3	4	5	F	3	4
Loupekine snark (second)	22	33	3	4	5	F	3	4
Markström graph	24	36	5	6	3	T	3	3
McGee graph	24	36	4	4	7	F	3	3
McLaughlin graph	275	15400	2	2	3	F	N/A	113
Meredith graph	70	140	7	8	4	F	3	5
Meringer 5-5-cage graph	30	75	3	3	5	F	3	5
Möbius–Kantor graph	16	24	4	4	6	F	2	3
Moser spindle	7	11	2	2	3	T	4	4
Nauru graph	24	36	4	4	6	F	2	3
Null graph	0	0	0	0	N/A	T	0	0
Octahedral graph	6	12	2	2	3	T	3	4
Paley graph of order 13	13	39	2	2	3	F	5	7
Pappus graph	18	27	4	4	6	F	2	3
Perkel graph	57	171	3	3	5	F	3	7
Petersen 3-5-cage graph	10	15	2	2	5	F	3	4
Poussin graph	15	39	3	3	3	T	4	6
Rhombicosidodecahedral graph	60	120	8	8	3	T	3	4
Rhombicuboctahedral graph	24	48	5	5	3	T	3	4
Robertson 4-5-cage graph	19	38	3	3	5	F	3	5
Robertson–Wegner 5-5-cage graph	30	75	3	3	5	F	4	5
Schläfli graph	27	216	2	2	3	F	9	17
Shrikhande graph	16	48	2	2	3	F	4	6
Snub cubical graph	24	60	4	4	3	T	3	5
Snub dodecahedral graph	60	150	7	7	3	T	4	5
Sousselier graph	16	27	2	3	5	F	3	5
Suzuki graph	1782	370656	2	2	3	N/A	N/A	N/A
Sylvester graph	36	90	3	3	5	F	4	5
Szekeres snark	50	75	6	7	5	F	3	4
Tetrahedral graph	4	6	1	1	3	T	4	3
Thomsen graph	6	9	2	2	4	F	2	3
Tietze's graph	12	18	3	3	3	F	3	4
Triangle graph	3	3	1	1	3	T	3	3
Truncated cubical graph	24	36	6	6	3	T	3	3
Truncated cuboctahedral graph	48	72	9	9	4	T	2	3
Truncated dodecahedral graph	60	90	10	10	3	T	3	3
Truncated icosahedral graph (60-fullerene)	60	90	9	9	5	T	3	3
Truncated icosidodecahedral graph	120	180	15	15	4	T	2	3
Truncated octahedral graph	24	36	6	6	4	T	2	3
Truncated tetrahedral graph	12	18	3	3	3	T	3	3
Tutte 3-12-cage	126	189	6	6	12	F	2	3
Tutte graph	46	69	5	8	4	T	3	3
Tutte 3-8-cage graph	30	45	4	4	8	F	2	3
Wagner graph	8	12	2	2	4	F	3	3
Watkins snark	50	75	7	7	5	F	3	4
Wells graph	32	80	4	4	5	F	4	5
Wiener–Araya graph	42	67	5	7	4	T	3	4
Wong 5-5-cage graph	30	75	3	3	5	F	4	5
