= List of graphs =

This partial list of graphs contains definitions of graphs and graph families. For collected definitions of graph theory terms that do not refer to individual graph types, such as vertex and path, see Glossary of graph theory. For links to existing articles about particular kinds of graphs, see Category:Graphs. Some of the finite structures considered in graph theory have names, sometimes inspired by the graph's topology, and sometimes after their discoverer. A famous example is the Petersen graph, a concrete graph on 10 vertices that appears as a minimal example or counterexample in many different contexts.

== Individual graphs ==
Balaban 10-cage

Balaban 11-cage

Bidiakis cube

Brinkmann graph

Bull graph

Butterfly graph

Chvátal graph

Diamond graph

Dürer graph

Ellingham–Horton 54-graph

Ellingham–Horton 78-graph

Errera graph

Franklin graph

Frucht graph

Goldner–Harary graph

Golomb graph

Grötzsch graph

Harries graph

Harries–Wong graph

Herschel graph

Hoffman graph

Hofman Graph H(12,4)

Holt graph

Horton graph

Kittell graph

Markström graph

McGee graph

Meredith graph

Moser spindle

Sousselier graph

Poussin graph

Robertson graph

Sylvester graph

Tutte's fragment

Tutte graph

Young–Fibonacci graph

Wagner graph

Wells graph

Wiener–Araya graph

Windmill graph

== Highly symmetric graphs ==
=== Strongly regular graphs ===
The strongly regular graph on v vertices and rank k is usually denoted srg(v,k,λ,μ).

Clebsch graph

Cameron graph

Petersen graph

Hall–Janko graph

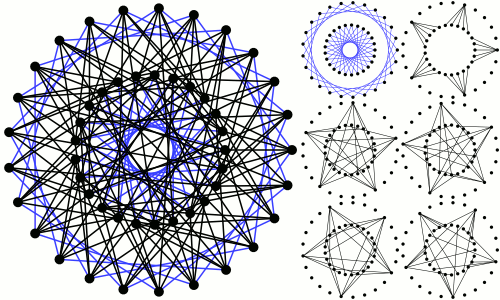
Hoffman–Singleton graph

Higman–Sims graph

Paley graph of order 13

Shrikhande graph

Schläfli graph

Brouwer–Haemers graph

Local McLaughlin graph

Perkel graph

Gewirtz graph

=== Symmetric graphs ===
A symmetric graph is one in which there is a symmetry (graph automorphism) taking any ordered pair of adjacent vertices to any other ordered pair; the Foster census lists all small symmetric 3-regular graphs. Every strongly regular graph is symmetric, but not vice versa.

Heawood graph

Möbius–Kantor graph

Pappus graph

Desargues graph

Nauru graph

Coxeter graph

Tutte–Coxeter graph

Dyck graph

Klein graph

Foster graph

Biggs–Smith graph

The Rado graph

=== Semi-symmetric graphs ===
Folkman graph

Gray graph

Ljubljana graph

Tutte 12-cage

== Graph families ==
=== Complete graphs ===
The complete graph on $n$ vertices is often called the $n$-clique and usually denoted $K_n$, from German komplett.

$K_1$

$K_2$

$K_3$

$K_4$

$K_5$

$K_6$

$K_7$

$K_8$

=== Complete bipartite graphs ===
The complete bipartite graph is usually denoted $K_{n,m}$. For $n=1$ see the section on star graphs. The graph $K_{2,2}$ equals the 4-cycle $C_4$ (the square) introduced below.

$K_{2,3}$

$K_{3,3}$, the utility graph

$K_{2,4}$

$K_{3,4}$

=== Cycles ===
The cycle graph on $n$ vertices is called the n-cycle and usually denoted $C_n$. It is also called a cyclic graph, a polygon or the n-gon. Special cases are the triangle $C_3$, the square $C_4$, and then several with Greek naming pentagon $C_5$, hexagon $C_6$, etc.

$C_3$

$C_4$

$C_5$

$C_6$

=== Friendship graphs ===
The friendship graph F_{n} can be constructed by joining n copies of the cycle graph C_{3} with a common vertex.

The friendship graphs F_{2}, F_{3} and F_{4}.

=== Fullerene graphs ===
In graph theory, a fullerene is any polyhedral graph with all faces of size 5 or 6 (including the external face). It follows from Euler's polyhedron formula, V − E + F = 2 (where V, E, F indicate the number of vertices, edges, and faces), that there are exactly 12 pentagons in a fullerene and h = V/2 − 10 hexagons. Therefore V = 20 + 2h; E = 30 + 3h. Fullerene graphs are the Schlegel representations of the corresponding fullerene compounds.

20-fullerene (dodecahedral graph)

24-fullerene (Hexagonal truncated trapezohedron graph)

26-fullerene graph

60-fullerene (truncated icosahedral graph)

70-fullerene

An algorithm to generate all the non-isomorphic fullerenes with a given number of hexagonal faces has been developed by G. Brinkmann and A. Dress. G. Brinkmann also provided a freely available implementation, called fullgen.

=== Platonic solids ===
The complete graph on four vertices forms the skeleton of the tetrahedron, and more generally the complete graphs form skeletons of simplices. The hypercube graphs are also skeletons of higher-dimensional regular polytopes.

Cube
$n=8$, $m=12$

Octahedron
$n=6$, $m=12$

Dodecahedron
$n=20$, $m=30$

Icosahedron
$n=12$, $m=30$

=== Truncated solids ===
Truncated tetrahedron

Truncated cube

Truncated octahedron

Truncated dodecahedron

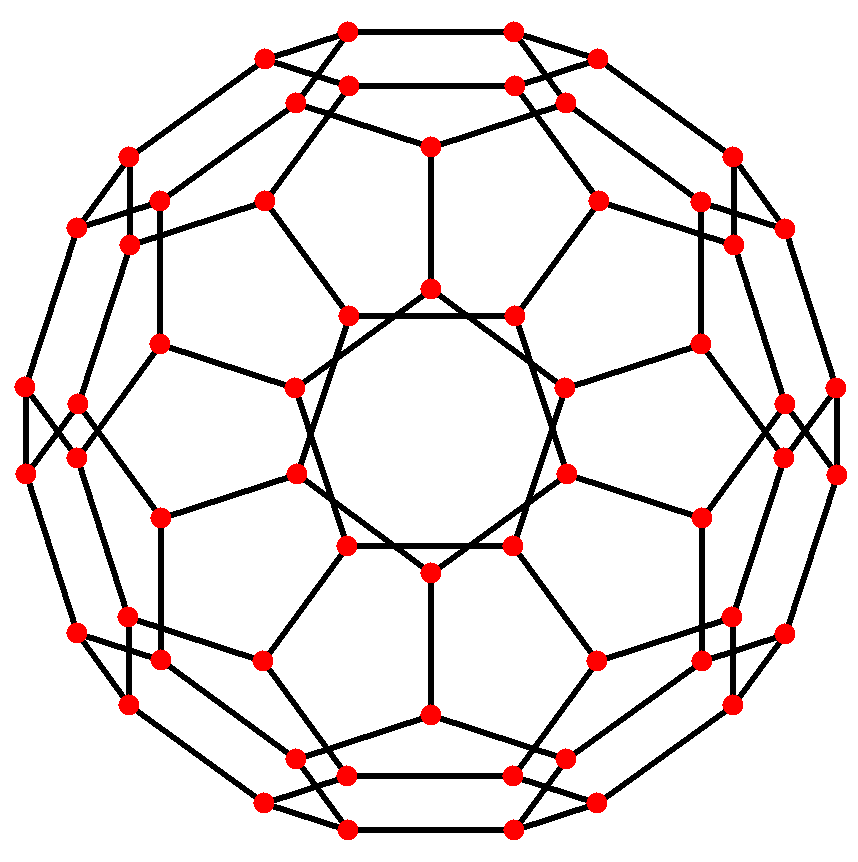
Truncated icosahedron

=== Snarks ===
A snark is a bridgeless cubic graph that requires four colors in any proper edge coloring. The smallest snark is the Petersen graph, already listed above.

Blanuša snark (first)

Blanuša snark (second)

Double-star snark

Flower snark

Loupekine snark (first)

Loupekine snark (second)

Szekeres snark

Tietze graph

Watkins snark

=== Star ===
A star S_{k} is the complete bipartite graph K_{1,k}. The star S_{3} is called the claw graph.

The star graphs S_{3}, S_{4}, S_{5} and S_{6}.

=== Wheel graphs ===
The wheel graph W_{n} is a graph on n vertices constructed by connecting a single vertex to every vertex in an (n − 1)-cycle.

Wheels $W_4$ – $W_9$.

== Other graphs ==
This partial list contains definitions of graphs and graph families which are known by particular names, but do not have a Wikipedia article of their own.

=== Gear ===
G_{4}

A gear graph, denoted G_{n}, is a graph obtained by inserting an extra vertex between each pair of adjacent vertices on the perimeter of a wheel graph W_{n}. Thus, G_{n} has 2n+1 vertices and 3n edges. Gear graphs are examples of squaregraphs, and play a key role in the forbidden graph characterization of squaregraphs. Gear graphs are also known as cogwheels and bipartite wheels.

=== Helm ===
A helm graph, denoted H_{n}, is a graph obtained by attaching a single edge and node to each node of the outer circuit of a wheel graph W_{n}.

=== Lobster ===
A lobster graph is a tree in which all the vertices are within distance 2 of a central path. Compare caterpillar.

=== Web ===
The web graph W_{4,2} is a cube.

The web graph W_{n,r} is a graph consisting of r concentric copies of the cycle graph C_{n}, with corresponding vertices connected by "spokes". Thus W_{n,1} is the same graph as C_{n}, and W_{n,2} is a prism.

A web graph has also been defined as a prism graph Y_{n+1, 3}, with the edges of the outer cycle removed.
