= Double-star snark =

- The Double-star snark
- Vertices: 30
- Edges: 45
- Radius: 4
- Diameter: 4
- Girth: 6
- Automorphisms: 80
- Chromatic number: 3
- Chromatic index: 4
- Book thickness: 3
- Queue number: 2
- Properties: Snark; Hypohamiltonian

In the mathematical field of graph theory, the double-star snark is a snark with 30 vertices and 45 edges.

In 1975, Rufus Isaacs introduced two infinite families of snarks—the flower snark and the BDS snark, a family that includes the two Blanuša snarks, the Descartes snark and the Szekeres snark (BDS stands for Blanuša Descartes Szekeres). Isaacs also discovered one 30-vertex snark that does not belong to the BDS family and that is not a flower snark — the double-star snark.

As a snark, the double-star graph is a connected, bridgeless cubic graph with chromatic index equal to 4. The double-star snark is non-planar but is 1-planar. It is non-hamiltonian but is hypohamiltonian. It has book thickness 3 and queue number 2.

== Gallery ==
The chromatic number of the double-star snark is 3.

The chromatic index of the double-star snark is 4.
