= Flower snark =

Infinite family of graphs

- The flower snarks J_{3}, J_{5} and J_{7}.
- Vertices: 4n
- Edges: 6n
- Girth: 3 for n=3 5 for n=5 6 for n≥7
- Chromatic number: 3
- Chromatic index: 4
- Book thickness: 3 for n=5 3 for n=7
- Queue number: 2 for n=5 2 for n=7
- Properties: Snark for n≥5
- Notation: J_{n} with n odd

Flower snark J_{5}
- The flower snark J_{5}.
- Vertices: 20
- Edges: 30
- Girth: 5
- Chromatic number: 3
- Chromatic index: 4
- Properties: Snark; Hypohamiltonian

In the mathematical field of graph theory, the flower snarks form an infinite family of snarks introduced by Rufus Isaacs in 1975.

As snarks, the flower snarks are connected, bridgeless cubic graphs with chromatic index equal to 4. The flower snarks are non-planar and non-Hamiltonian, though they are 1-planar. The flower snarks J_{5} and J_{7} have book thickness 3 and queue number 2.

== Construction ==
The flower snark J_{n} can be constructed with the following process :

- Build n copies of the star graph on 4 vertices. Denote the central vertex of each star A_{i} and the outer vertices B_{i}, C_{i} and D_{i}. This results in a disconnected graph on 4n vertices with 3n edges (A_{i} − B_{i}, A_{i} − C_{i} and A_{i} − D_{i} for 1 ≤ i ≤ n).
- Construct the n-cycle (B_{1}... B_{n}). This adds n edges.
- Finally construct the 2n-cycle (C_{1}... C_{n}D_{1}... D_{n}). This adds 2n edges.

By construction, the Flower snark J_{n} is a cubic graph with 4n vertices and 6n edges. For it to have the required properties, n should be odd.

== Special cases ==
The name flower snark is sometimes used for J_{5}, a flower snark with 20 vertices and 30 edges. It is one of 6 snarks on 20 vertices (sequence A130315 in the OEIS). The flower snark J_{5} is hypohamiltonian.

J_{3} is a trivial variation of the Petersen graph formed by replacing one of its vertices by a triangle. This graph is also known as the Tietze's graph. In order to avoid trivial cases, snarks are generally restricted to have girth at least 5. With that restriction, J_{3} is not a snark.

== Gallery ==
The chromatic number of the flower snark J_{5} is 3.

The chromatic index of the flower snark J_{5} is 4.

The original representation of the flower snark J_{5}.

The Petersen graph as a graph minor of the flower snark J_{5}
