= Watkins snark =

Snark with 50 vertices and 75 edges

- The Watkins snark
- Named after: J. J. Watkins
- Vertices: 50
- Edges: 75
- Radius: 7
- Diameter: 7
- Girth: 5
- Automorphisms: 5
- Chromatic number: 3
- Chromatic index: 4
- Book thickness: 3
- Queue number: 2
- Properties: Snark

In the mathematical field of graph theory, the Watkins snark is a snark with 50 vertices and 75 edges. It was discovered by John J. Watkins in 1989.

As a snark, the Watkins graph is a connected, bridgeless cubic graph with chromatic index equal to 4. The Watkins snark is also non-planar, 1-planar, and non-hamiltonian. It has book thickness 3 and queue number 2.

Another well known snark on 50 vertices is the Szekeres snark, the fifth known snark, discovered by George Szekeres in 1973.

== Gallery ==
The chromatic number of the Watkins snark is 3.

The chromatic index of the Watkins snark is 4.

== Edges ==
[[1,2], [1,4], [1,15], [2,3], [2,8], [3,6], [3,37], [4,6], [4,7], [5,10], [5,11], [5,22], [6,9], [7,8], [7,12], [8,9], [9,14], [10,13], [10,17], [11,16], [11,18], [12,14], [12,33], [13,15], [13,16], [14,20], [15,21], [16,19], [17,18], [17,19], [18,30], [19,21], [20,24], [20,26], [21,50], [22,23], [22,27], [23,24], [23,25], [24,29], [25,26], [25,28], [26,31], [27,28], [27,48], [28,29], [29,31], [30,32], [30,36], [31,36], [32,34], [32,35], [33,34], [33,40], [34,41], [35,38], [35,40], [36,38], [37,39], [37,42], [38,41], [39,44], [39,46], [40,46], [41,46], [42,43], [42,45], [43,44], [43,49], [44,47], [45,47], [45,48], [47,50], [48,49], [49,50]]
