= Tietze's graph =

Undirected cubic graph with 12 vertices and 18 edges

- The Tietze graph
- Vertices: 12
- Edges: 18
- Radius: 3
- Diameter: 3
- Girth: 3
- Automorphisms: 12 (D_{6})
- Chromatic number: 3
- Chromatic index: 4
- Properties: Cubic; Snark

Tietze's subdivision of a Möbius strip into six mutually-adjacent regions. The vertices and edges of the subdivision form an embedding of Tietze's graph onto the strip.

In the mathematical field of graph theory, Tietze's graph is an undirected cubic graph with 12 vertices and 18 edges. It is named after Heinrich Franz Friedrich Tietze, who showed in 1910 that the Möbius strip can be subdivided into six regions that all touch each other – three along the boundary of the strip and three along its center line – and therefore that graphs that are embedded onto the Möbius strip may require six colors. The boundary segments of the regions of Tietze's subdivision (including the segments along the boundary of the Möbius strip itself) form an embedding of Tietze's graph.

== Relation to Petersen graph ==
Tietze's graph may be formed from the Petersen graph by replacing one of its vertices with a triangle. Like the Tietze graph, the Petersen graph forms the boundary of six mutually touching regions, but on the projective plane rather than on the Möbius strip. If one cuts a hole from this subdivision of the projective plane, surrounding a single vertex, the surrounded vertex is replaced by a triangle of region boundaries around the hole, giving the previously described construction of the Tietze graph.

== Hamiltonicity ==
Both Tietze's graph and the Petersen graph are maximally nonhamiltonian: they have no Hamiltonian cycle, but any two non-adjacent vertices can be connected by a Hamiltonian path. Tietze's graph and the Petersen graph are the only 2-vertex-connected cubic non-Hamiltonian graphs with 12 or fewer vertices.

Unlike the Petersen graph, Tietze's graph is not hypohamiltonian: removing one of its three triangle vertices forms a smaller graph that remains non-Hamiltonian.

== Edge coloring and perfect matchings ==
Edge coloring Tietze's graph requires four colors; that is, its chromatic index is 4. Equivalently, the edges of Tietze's graph can be partitioned into four matchings, but no fewer.

Tietze's graph matches part of the definition of a snark: it is a cubic bridgeless graph that is not 3-edge-colorable. However, most authors restrict snarks to graphs without 3-cycles, so Tietze's graph is not generally considered to be a snark. Nevertheless, it is isomorphic to the graph J_{3}, part of an infinite family of flower snarks introduced by R. Isaacs in 1975.

Unlike the Petersen graph, the Tietze graph can be covered by four perfect matchings. This property plays a key role in a proof that testing whether a graph can be covered by four perfect matchings is NP-complete.

== Additional properties ==
Tietze's graph has chromatic number 3, chromatic index 4, girth 3 and diameter 3. The independence number is 5. Its automorphism group has order 12, and is isomorphic to the dihedral group D_{6}, the group of symmetries of a regular hexagon (including both rotations and reflections). This group has two orbits of size 3 and one of size 6 on vertices, and thus this graph is not vertex-transitive.

== Gallery ==
The chromatic number of the Tietze graph is 3.

The chromatic index of the Tietze graph is 4.

The Tietze graph has crossing number 2 and is 1-planar.

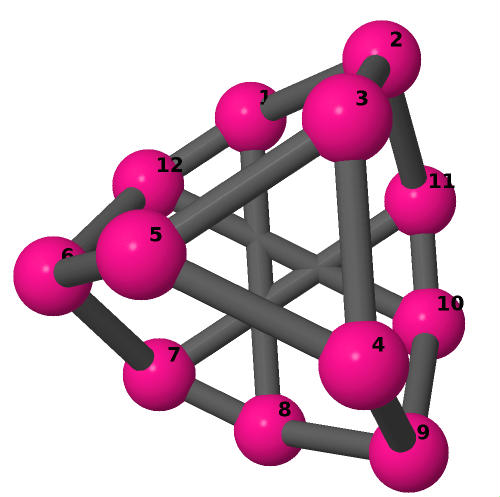
A three-dimensional embedding of the Tietze graph.

== See also ==
- Dürer graph and Franklin graph, two other 12-vertex cubic graphs
