= Blanuša =

Blanuša (Serbian Cyrillic: Блануша) is a surname. Notable people with the surname include:

- Branko Blanuša (born 1969), Bosnian professor and politician
- Danilo Blanuša (1903–1987), Croatian mathematician and physicist

== See also ==
- Blanuša snarks, two 3-regular graphs with 18 vertices and 27 edges
