= Szekeres snark =

Szekeres snark with 50 tops and 75 edges

- The Szekeres snark
- Named after: George Szekeres
- Vertices: 50
- Edges: 75
- Radius: 6
- Diameter: 7
- Girth: 5
- Automorphisms: 20
- Chromatic number: 3
- Chromatic index: 4
- Book thickness: 3
- Queue number: 2
- Properties: Snark; Hypohamiltonian

In the mathematical field of graph theory, the Szekeres snark is a snark with 50 vertices and 75 edges. It was the fifth known snark, discovered by George Szekeres in 1973.

As a snark, the Szekeres graph is a connected, bridgeless cubic graph with chromatic index equal to 4. The Szekeres snark is non-planar but is 1-planar. It is non-hamiltonian but is hypohamiltonian. It has book thickness 3 and queue number 2.

Another well known snark on 50 vertices is the Watkins snark discovered by John J. Watkins in 1989.

== Gallery ==
The chromatic number of the Szekeres snark is 3.

The chromatic index of the Szekeres snark is 4.

Alternative drawing of the Szekeres snark.
