= Robertson graph =

4-regular undirected graph in mathematics

- The Robertson graph is Hamiltonian.
- Named after: Neil Robertson
- Vertices: 19
- Edges: 38
- Radius: 3
- Diameter: 3
- Girth: 5
- Automorphisms: 24 (D_{12})
- Chromatic number: 3
- Chromatic index: 5
- Book thickness: 3
- Queue number: 2
- Properties: Cage; Hamiltonian

In the mathematical field of graph theory, the Robertson graph or (4,5)-cage, is a 4-regular undirected graph with 19 vertices and 38 edges named after Neil Robertson.

The Robertson graph is the unique (4,5)-cage graph and was discovered by Robertson in 1964. As a cage graph, it is the smallest 4-regular graph with girth 5.

It has chromatic number 3, chromatic index 5, diameter 3, radius 3 and is both 4-vertex-connected and 4-edge-connected. It has book thickness 3 and queue number 2. The graph is neither planar nor 1-planar.

The Robertson graph is also a Hamiltonian graph which possesses 5,376 distinct directed Hamiltonian cycles.

The Robertson graph is one of the smallest graphs with cop number 4.

== Algebraic properties ==
The Robertson graph is not a vertex-transitive graph; its full automorphism group is isomorphic to the dihedral group of order 24, the group of symmetries of a regular dodecagon, including both rotations and reflections.

The characteristic polynomial of the Robertson graph is

$$(x-4)(x-1)^2(x^2-3)^2(x^2+x-5)$$
$$(x^2+x-4)^2(x^2+x-3)^2(x^2+x-1).\$$

== Gallery ==
The Robertson graph as drawn in the original publication.

The chromatic number of the Robertson graph is 3.

The chromatic index of the Robertson graph is 5.
