= Balaban 10-cage =

Cubic graph with 70 nodes and 105 edges

- The Balaban 10-cage
- Named after: Alexandru T. Balaban
- Vertices: 70
- Edges: 105
- Radius: 6
- Diameter: 6
- Girth: 10
- Automorphisms: 80
- Chromatic number: 2
- Chromatic index: 3
- Genus: 9
- Book thickness: 3
- Queue number: 2
- Properties: Cubic; Cage; Hamiltonian

In the mathematical field of graph theory, the Balaban 10-cage or Balaban (3,10)-cage is a 3-regular graph with 70 vertices and 105 edges named after Alexandru T. Balaban. Published in 1972, It was the first 10-cage discovered but it is not unique.

The proof of minimality of the number of vertices was given by Mary R. O'Keefe and Pak Ken Wong. There are 2 other distinct (3,10)-cages, the Harries graph and the Harries–Wong graph. The Harries–Wong graph and Harries graph are also cospectral.

The Balaban 10-cage has chromatic number 2, chromatic index 3, diameter 6, girth 10 and is hamiltonian. It is also a 3-vertex-connected graph and 3-edge-connected. The book thickness is 3 and the queue number is 2.

The characteristic polynomial of the Balaban 10-cage is

$$(x-3) (x-2) (x-1)^8 x^2 (x+1)^8 (x+2) (x+3) \cdot$$
$$\cdot(x^2-6)^2 (x^2-5)^4 (x^2-2)^2 (x^4-6 x^2+3)^8.$$

== Gallery ==
The chromatic number of the Balaban 10-cage is 2.

The chromatic index of the Balaban 10-cage is 3.

Another drawing of the Balaban 10-cage.

== See also ==
Molecular graph
Balaban 11-cage
