= Descartes snark =

- Image of a Descartes snark.
- Named after: Blanche Descartes
- Vertices: 210
- Edges: 315
- Girth: 5
- Chromatic index: 4
- Properties: Cubic; Snark

In the mathematical field of graph theory, a Descartes snark is an undirected graph with 210 vertices and 315 edges. It is a snark, a graph with three edges at each vertex that cannot be partitioned into three perfect matchings. It was first discovered by William Tutte in 1948 under the pseudonym Blanche Descartes.

A Descartes snark is obtained from the Petersen graph by replacing each vertex with a nonagon and each edge with a particular graph closely related to the Petersen graph. Because there are multiple ways to perform this procedure, there are multiple Descartes snarks.
