= Sousselier graph =

Hypohamiltonian graph in graph theory

- Vertices: 16
- Edges: 27
- Radius: 2
- Diameter: 3
- Girth: 5
- Automorphisms: 2
- Chromatic number: 3
- Chromatic index: 5
- Book thickness: 3
- Queue number: 2

The Sousselier graph is, in graph theory, a hypohamiltonian graph with 16 vertices and 27 edges. It has book thickness 3 and queue number 2.

== History ==
Hypohamiltonian graphs were first studied by Sousselier in Problèmes plaisants et délectables (1963) .

In 1967, Lindgren builds an infinite sequence of hypohamiltonian graphs. The graphs of this sequence all have 6k+10 vertices, for every integer k. The same sequence of hypohamiltonian graphs is independently built by Sousselier. In 1973 Chvátal explains in a scientific paper how edges can be added to some hypohamiltonian graphs in order to build new ones of the same order, and he names Bondy as the original author of the method. As an illustration, he shows that two edges can be added to the second graph of the Lindgren sequence (which he names Sousselier sequence) in order to build a new hypohamiltonian graph on 16 vertices. This graph is named the Sousselier graph.
