= Ellingham–Horton graph =

Ellingham–Horton graphs
- The Ellingham–Horton 54-graph.
- Named after: Joseph Horton and Mark Ellingham
- Vertices: 54 (54-graph); 78 (78-graph)
- Edges: 81 (54-graph); 117 (78-graph)
- Radius: 9 (54-graph); 7 (78-graph)
- Diameter: 10 (54-graph); 13 (78-graph)
- Girth: 6 (both)
- Automorphisms: 32 (54-graph); 16 (78-graph)
- Chromatic number: 2 (both)
- Chromatic index: 3 (both)
- Book thickness: 3 (both)
- Queue number: 2 (both)
- Properties: Cubic (both); Bipartite (both); Regular (both)

In the mathematical field of graph theory, the Ellingham–Horton graphs are two 3-regular graphs on 54 and 78 vertices: the Ellingham–Horton 54-graph and the Ellingham–Horton 78-graph. They are named after Joseph D. Horton and Mark N. Ellingham, their discoverers. These two graphs provide counterexamples to the conjecture of W. T. Tutte that every cubic 3-connected bipartite graph is Hamiltonian. The book thickness of the Ellingham-Horton 54-graph and the Ellingham-Horton 78-graph is 3 and the queue numbers 2. The Ellingham-Horton 54-graph is 1-planar.

The first counterexample to the Tutte conjecture was the Horton graph, published by Bondy & Murty (1976). After the Horton graph, a number of smaller counterexamples to the Tutte conjecture were found. Among them are a 92-vertex graph by Horton (1982), a 78-vertex graph by Owens (1983), and the two Ellingham–Horton graphs.

The first Ellingham–Horton graph was published by Ellingham (1981) and is of order 78. At that time it was the smallest known counterexample to the Tutte conjecture. The second Ellingham–Horton graph was published by Ellingham & Horton (1983) and is of order 54. In 1989, Georges' graph, the smallest currently-known Non-Hamiltonian 3-connected cubic bipartite graph was discovered, containing 50 vertices.

== Gallery ==
The chromatic number of the Ellingham–Horton 54-graph is 2.

The chromatic index of the Ellingham–Horton 54-graph is 3.

The chromatic number of the Ellingham–Horton 78-graph is 2.

The chromatic index of the Ellingham–Horton 78-graph is 3.
