= Harries graph =

Regular graph with 70 nodes and 105 edges

- The Harries graph
- Named after: W. Harries
- Vertices: 70
- Edges: 105
- Radius: 6
- Diameter: 6
- Girth: 10
- Automorphisms: 120 (S_{5})
- Chromatic number: 2
- Chromatic index: 3
- Genus: 9
- Book thickness: 3
- Queue number: 2
- Properties: Cubic; Cage; Triangle-free; Hamiltonian

In the mathematical field of graph theory, the Harries graph or Harries (3-10)-cage is a 3-regular, undirected graph with 70 vertices and 105 edges.

The Harries graph has chromatic number 2, chromatic index 3, radius 6, diameter 6, girth 10 and is Hamiltonian. It is also a 3-vertex-connected and 3-edge-connected, non-planar, cubic graph. It has book thickness 3 and queue number 2.

The characteristic polynomial of the Harries graph is

$$(x-3) (x-1)^4 (x+1)^4 (x+3) (x^2-6) (x^2-2) (x^4-6x^2+2)^5 (x^4-6x^2+3)^4 (x^4-6x^2+6)^5. \,$$

== History ==
In 1972, A. T. Balaban published a (3-10)-cage graph, a cubic graph that has as few vertices as possible for girth 10. It was the first (3-10)-cage discovered but it was not unique.

The complete list of (3-10)-cage and the proof of minimality was given by O'Keefe and Wong in 1980. There exist three distinct (3-10)-cage graphs—the Balaban 10-cage, the Harries graph and the Harries–Wong graph. Moreover, the Harries–Wong graph and Harries graph are cospectral graphs.

== Gallery ==
The chromatic number of the Harries graph is 2.

The chromatic index of the Harries graph is 3.

Alternative drawing of the Harries graph.

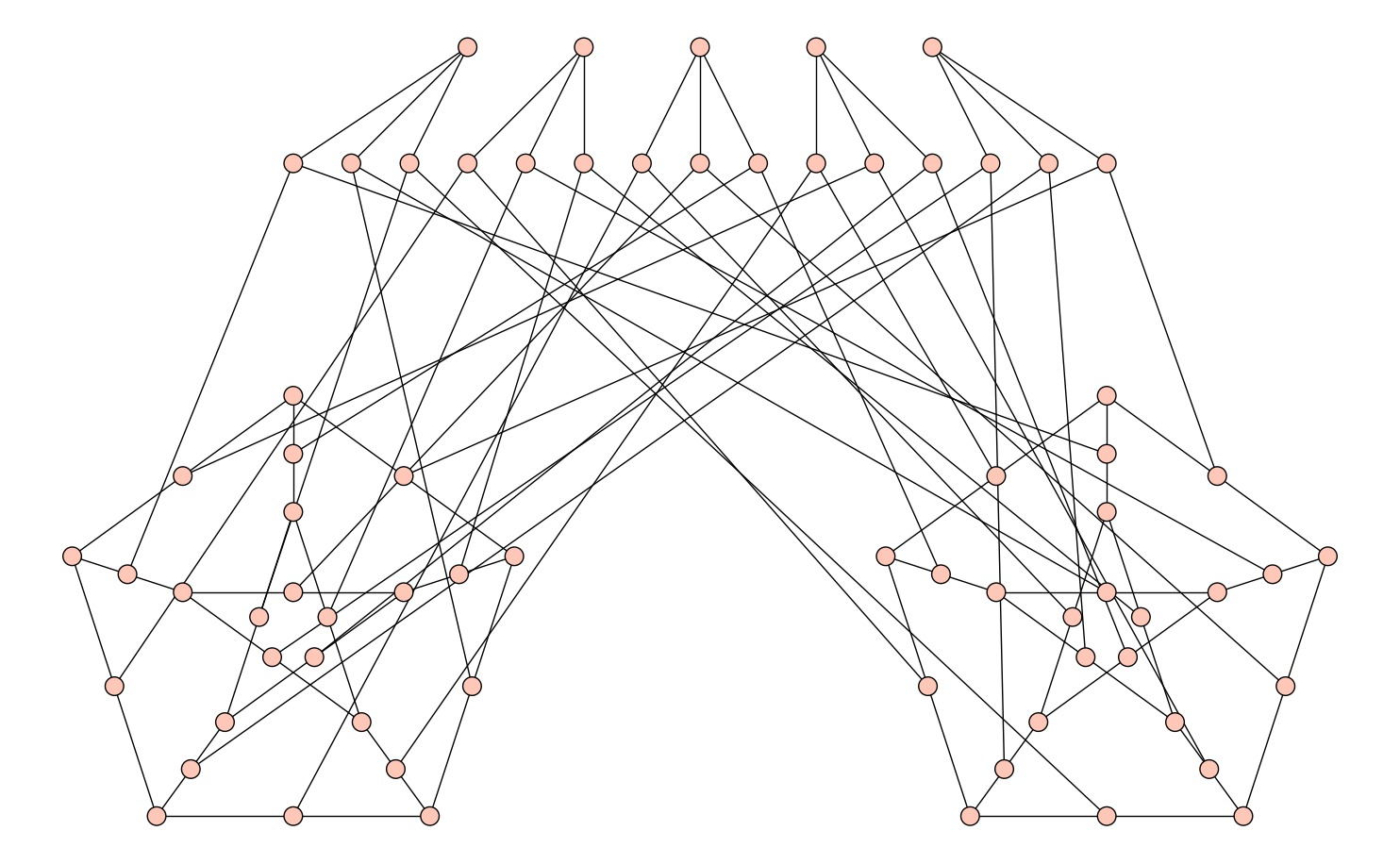
Alternative drawing emphasizing the graph's 4 orbits.
