= Harries–Wong graph =

- The Harries–Wong graph
- Named after: W. Harries, Pak-Ken Wong
- Vertices: 70
- Edges: 105
- Radius: 6
- Diameter: 6
- Girth: 10
- Automorphisms: 24 (S_{4})
- Chromatic number: 2
- Chromatic index: 3
- Genus: 9
- Book thickness: 3
- Queue number: 2
- Properties: Cubic; Cage; Triangle-free; Hamiltonian

In the mathematical field of graph theory, the Harries–Wong graph is a 3-regular undirected graph with 70 vertices and 105 edges.

The Harries–Wong graph has chromatic number 2, chromatic index 3, radius 6, diameter 6, girth 10 and is Hamiltonian. It is also a 3-vertex-connected and 3-edge-connected non-planar cubic graph. It has book thickness 3 and queue number 2.

The characteristic polynomial of the Harries–Wong graph is

$$(x-3) (x-1)^4 (x+1)^4 (x+3) (x^2-6) (x^2-2) (x^4-6x^2+2)^5 (x^4-6x^2+3)^4 (x^4-6x^2+6)^5. \,$$

== History ==
In 1972, A. T. Balaban published a (3-10)-cage graph, a cubic graph that has as few vertices as possible for girth 10. It was the first (3-10)-cage discovered but it was not unique.

The complete list of (3-10)-cages and the proof of minimality was given by O'Keefe and Wong in 1980. There exist three distinct (3-10)-cage graphs—the Balaban 10-cage, the Harries graph and the Harries–Wong graph. Moreover, the Harries–Wong graph and Harries graph are cospectral graphs.

== Gallery ==
The chromatic number of the Harries–Wong graph is 2.

The chromatic index of the Harries–Wong graph is 3.

Alternative drawing of the Harries–Wong graph.

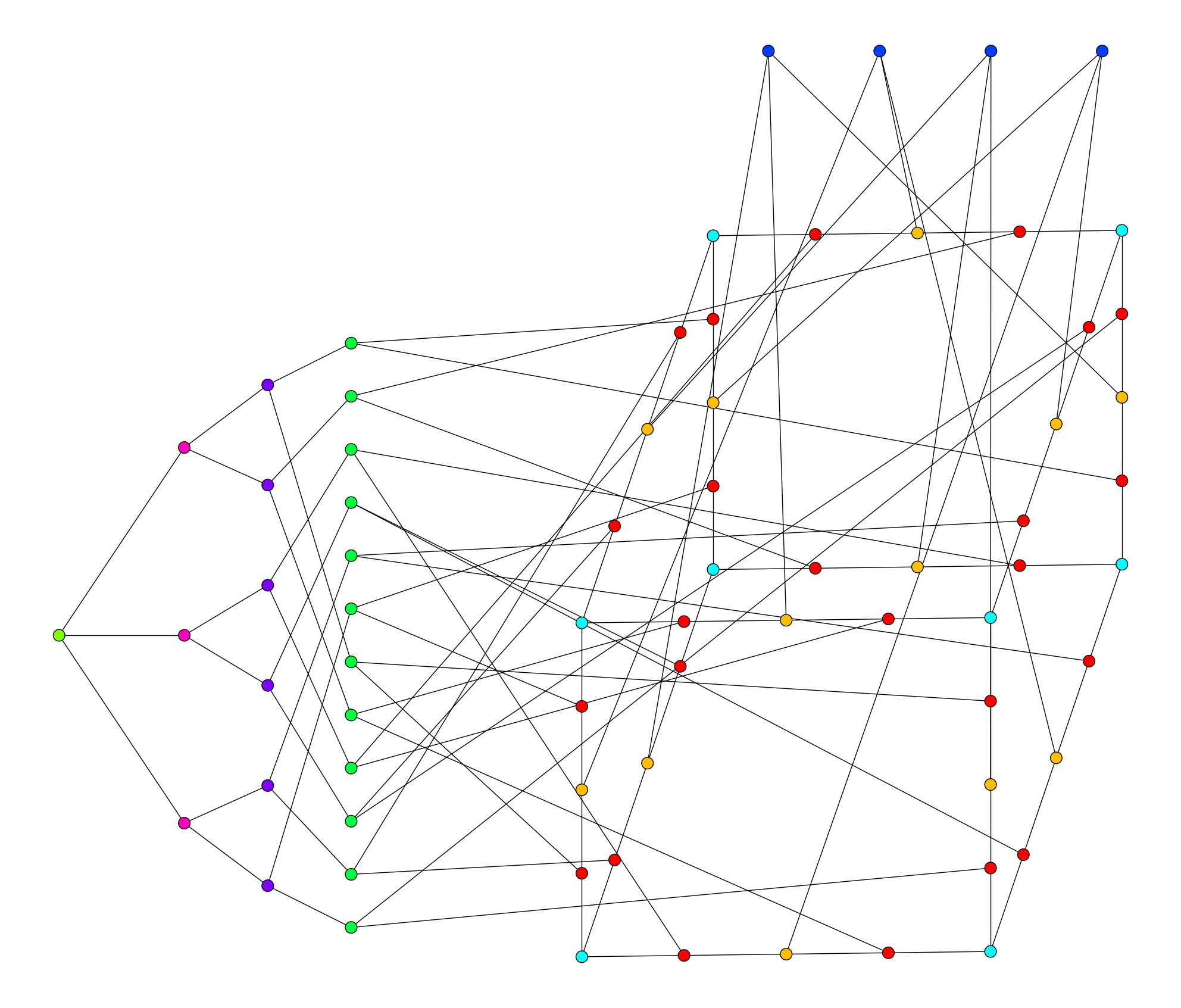
The 8 orbits of the Harries–Wong graph.
