= Meredith graph =

4-regular undirected graph with 70 vertices and 140 edges

- The Meredith graph
- Named after: G. H. Meredith
- Vertices: 70
- Edges: 140
- Radius: 7
- Diameter: 8
- Girth: 4
- Automorphisms: 38698352640
- Chromatic number: 3
- Chromatic index: 5
- Book thickness: 3
- Queue number: 2
- Properties: Eulerian

In the mathematical field of graph theory, the Meredith graph is a 4-regular undirected graph with 70 vertices and 140 edges discovered by Guy H. J. Meredith in 1973.

The Meredith graph is 4-vertex-connected and 4-edge-connected, has chromatic number 3, chromatic index 5, radius 7, diameter 8, girth 4 and is non-Hamiltonian. It has book thickness 3 and queue number 2.

Published in 1973, it provides a counterexample to the Crispin Nash-Williams conjecture that every 4-regular 4-vertex-connected graph is Hamiltonian. However, W. T. Tutte showed that all 4-connected planar graphs are hamiltonian.

The characteristic polynomial of the Meredith graph is $(x-4) (x-1)^{10} x^{21} (x+1)^{11} (x+3) (x^2-13) (x^6-26 x^4+3 x^3+169 x^2-39 x-45)^4$.

== Gallery ==
The chromatic number of the Meredith graph is 3.

The chromatic index of the Meredith graph is 5.
