= Suzuki graph =

- Vertices: 1782
- Edges: 370,656
- Radius: 2
- Diameter: 2
- Girth: 3
- Automorphisms: 896,690,995,200
- Properties: Strongly regular Symmetric graph

The Suzuki graph is a strongly regular graph with parameters $(1782, 416, 100, 96)$. Its automorphism group has order 896,690,995,200 and contains as a subgroup of order 2 the Suzuki sporadic group. It is named for Michio Suzuki.
