= Wells graph =

- Vertices: 32
- Edges: 80
- Radius: 4
- Diameter: 4
- Girth: 5
- Automorphisms: 1920
- Chromatic number: 4
- Chromatic index: 5
- Queue number: 3
- Properties: Distance regular Hamiltonian

The Wells graph is the unique distance-regular graph with intersection array $(5,4,1,1;1,1,4,5).$

Its spectrum is $5^1 \sqrt{5}^8 1^{10} (-\sqrt{5})^8(-3)^5$. Its queue number is 3 and an upper bound on its book thickness is 5.
