= Horton graph =

- The Horton graph
- Named after: Joseph Horton
- Vertices: 96
- Edges: 144
- Radius: 10
- Diameter: 10
- Girth: 6
- Automorphisms: 96 (Z/2Z×Z/2Z×S_{4})
- Chromatic number: 2
- Chromatic index: 3
- Book thickness: 3
- Queue number: 2
- Properties: Cubic; Bipartite

In the mathematical field of graph theory, the Horton graph or Horton 96-graph is a 3-regular graph with 96 vertices and 144 edges discovered by Joseph Horton. Published by Bondy and Murty in 1976, it provides a counterexample to the Tutte conjecture that every cubic 3-connected bipartite graph is Hamiltonian.

After the Horton graph, a number of smaller counterexamples to the Tutte conjecture were found. Among them are a 92 vertex graph by Horton published in 1982, a 78 vertex graph by Owens published in 1983, and the two Ellingham-Horton graphs (54 and 78 vertices).

The first Ellingham-Horton graph was published by Ellingham in 1981 and was of order 78. At that time, it was the smallest known counterexample to the Tutte conjecture. The second one was published by Ellingham and Horton in 1983 and was of order 54. In 1989, Georges' graph, the smallest currently-known non-Hamiltonian 3-connected cubic bipartite graph was discovered, containing 50 vertices.

As a non-Hamiltonian cubic graph with many long cycles, the Horton graph provides good benchmark for programs that search for Hamiltonian cycles.

The Horton graph has chromatic number 2, chromatic index 3, radius 10, diameter 10, girth 6, book thickness 3 and queue number 2. It is also a 3-edge-connected graph.

== Algebraic properties ==
The automorphism group of the Horton graph is of order 96 and is isomorphic to Z/2Z×Z/2Z×S_{4}, the direct product of the Klein four-group and the symmetric group S_{4}.

The characteristic polynomial of the Horton graph is : $(x-3) (x-1)^{14} x^4 (x+1)^{14} (x+3) (x^2-5)^3 (x^2-3)^{11}(x^2-x-3) (x^2+x-3)$ $(x^{10}-23 x^8+188 x^6-644 x^4+803 x^2-101)^2$ $(x^{10}-20 x^8+143 x^6-437 x^4+500 x^2-59)$.

== Gallery ==
The chromatic number of the Horton graph is 2.

The chromatic index of the Horton graph is 3.

The Ellingham-Horton 54-graph, a smaller counterexample to the Tutte conjecture.
