= Kittell graph =

Planar graph with 23 vertices and 63 edges

- The Kittell graph
- Vertices: 23
- Edges: 63
- Radius: 3
- Diameter: 4
- Girth: 3

In the mathematical field of graph theory, the Kittell graph is a planar graph with 23 vertices and 63 edges. Its unique planar embedding has 42 triangular faces. The Kittell graph is named after Irving Kittell, who used it as a counterexample to Alfred Kempe's flawed proof of the four-color theorem. Simpler counterexamples include the Errera graph and Poussin graph (both published earlier than Kittell) and the Fritsch graph and Soifer graph.
