= Sylvester graph =

- Vertices: 36
- Edges: 90
- Radius: 3
- Diameter: 3
- Girth: 5
- Automorphisms: 1440
- Chromatic number: 4
- Chromatic index: 5
- Properties: Distance regular Hamiltonian

The Sylvester graph is the unique distance-regular graph with intersection array $\{5,4,2;1,1,4\}$. It is a subgraph of the Hoffman–Singleton graph.
