= McLaughlin graph =

- Vertices: 275
- Edges: 15400
- Radius: 2
- Diameter: 2
- Girth: 3
- Automorphisms: 1796256000

In the mathematical field of graph theory, the McLaughlin graph is a strongly regular graph with parameters (275, 112, 30, 56) and is the only such graph.

The group theorist Jack McLaughlin discovered that the automorphism group of this graph had a subgroup of index 2 which was a previously undiscovered finite simple group, now called the McLaughlin sporadic group.

The automorphism group has rank 3, meaning that its point stabilizer subgroup divides the remaining 274 vertices into two orbits. Those orbits contain 112 and 162 vertices. The former is the colinearity graph of the generalized quadrangle GQ(3,9). The latter is a strongly regular graph called the local McLaughlin graph.
