= Balaban 11-cage =

3-regular graph

- The Balaban 11-cage
- Named after: Alexandru T. Balaban
- Vertices: 112
- Edges: 168
- Radius: 6
- Diameter: 8
- Girth: 11
- Automorphisms: 64
- Chromatic number: 3
- Chromatic index: 3
- Genus: 16
- Properties: Cubic; Cage; Hamiltonian

In the mathematical field of graph theory, the Balaban 11-cage or Balaban (3,11)-cage is a 3-regular graph with 112 vertices and 168 edges named after Alexandru T. Balaban.

The Balaban 11-cage is the unique (3,11)-cage. It was discovered by Balaban in 1973. The uniqueness was proved by Brendan McKay and Wendy Myrvold in 2003.

The Balaban 11-cage is a Hamiltonian graph and can be constructed by excision from the Tutte 12-cage by removing a small subtree and suppressing the resulting vertices of degree two.

It has independence number 52, chromatic number 3, chromatic index 3, radius 6, diameter 8 and girth 11. It is also a 3-vertex-connected graph and a 3-edge-connected graph.

The characteristic polynomial of the Balaban 11-cage is:

$$(x-3) x^{12} (x^2-6)^5 (x^2-2)^{12} (x^3-x^2-4 x+2)^2\cdot$$
$$\cdot(x^3+x^2-6 x-2) (x^4-x^3-6 x^2+4 x+4)^4 \cdot$$
$$\cdot(x^5+x^4-8 x^3-6 x^2+12 x+4)^8$$.

The automorphism group of the Balaban 11-cage is of order 64.

== Gallery ==
The chromatic number of the Balaban 11-cage is 3.

The chromatic index of the Balaban 11-cage is 3.

Alternative drawing of the Balaban 11-cage.
