= Hypohamiltonian graph =

Type of graph in graph theory

A hypohamiltonian graph constructed by Lindgren (1967)

In the mathematical field of graph theory, a graph G is said to be hypohamiltonian if G itself does not have a Hamiltonian cycle but every graph formed by removing a single vertex from G is Hamiltonian.

== History ==
Hypohamiltonian graphs were first studied by Sousselier (1963). Lindgren (1967) cites Gaudin, Herz & Rossi (1964) and Busacker & Saaty (1965) as additional early papers on the subject; another early work is by Herz, Duby & Vigué (1967).

Grötschel (1980) sums up much of the research in this area with the following sentence: “The articles dealing with those graphs ... usually exhibit new classes of hypohamiltonian or hypotraceable graphs showing that for certain orders n such graphs indeed exist or that they possess strange and unexpected properties.”

== Applications ==
Hypohamiltonian graphs arise in integer programming solutions to the traveling salesman problem: certain kinds of hypohamiltonian graphs define facets of the traveling salesman polytope, a shape defined as the convex hull of the set of possible solutions to the traveling salesman problem, and these facets may be used in cutting-plane methods for solving the problem. Grötschel (1980) observes that the computational complexity of determining whether a graph is hypohamiltonian, although unknown, is likely to be high, making it difficult to find facets of these types except for those defined by small hypohamiltonian graphs; fortunately, the smallest graphs lead to the strongest inequalities for this application.

Concepts closely related to hypohamiltonicity have also been used by Park, Lim & Kim (2007) to measure the fault tolerance of network topologies for parallel computing.

== Properties ==
Every hypohamiltonian graph must be 3-vertex-connected, as the removal of any two vertices leaves a Hamiltonian path, which is connected. There exist n-vertex hypohamiltonian graphs in which the maximum degree is n/2, and in which there are approximately n^{2}/4 edges.

Thomassen's (1974b) girth-3 hypohamiltonian graph

Herz, Duby & Vigué (1967) conjectured that every hypohamiltonian graph has girth 5 or more, but this was disproved by Thomassen (1974b), who found examples with girth 3 and 4. For some time it was unknown whether a hypohamiltonian graph could be planar, but several examples are now known, the smallest of which has 40 vertices. Every planar hypohamiltonian graph has at least one vertex with only three incident edges.

If a 3-regular graph is Hamiltonian, its edges can be colored with three colors: use alternating colors for the edges on the Hamiltonian cycle (which must have even length by the handshaking lemma) and a third color for all remaining edges. Therefore, all snarks, bridgeless cubic graphs that require four edge colors, must be non-Hamiltonian, and many known snarks are hypohamiltonian. Every hypohamiltonian snark is bicritical: removing any two vertices leaves a subgraph the edges of which can be colored with only three colors. A 3-coloring of this subgraph can be simply described: after removing one vertex, the remaining vertices contain a Hamiltonian cycle. After removing a second vertex, this cycle becomes a path, the edges of which may be colored by alternating between two colors. The remaining edges form a matching and may be colored with a third color.

The color classes of any 3-coloring of the edges of a 3-regular graph form three matchings such that each edge belongs to exactly one of the matchings. Hypohamiltonian snarks do not have a partition into matchings of this type, but Häggkvist (2007) conjectures that the edges of any hypohamiltonian snark may be used to form six matchings such that each edge belongs to exactly two of the matchings. This is a special case of the Berge–Fulkerson conjecture that any snark has six matchings with this property.

Hypohamiltonian graphs cannot be bipartite: in a bipartite graph, a vertex can only be deleted to form a Hamiltonian subgraph if it belongs to the larger of the graph's two color classes. However, every bipartite graph occurs as an induced subgraph of some hypohamiltonian graph.

== Examples ==
The smallest hypohamiltonian graph is the Petersen graph (Herz, Duby & Vigué 1967). More generally, the generalized Petersen graph GP(n,2) is hypohamiltonian when n is congruent to 5 modulo 6; the Petersen graph is the instance of this construction with n = 5.

Lindgren (1967) found another infinite class of hypohamiltonian graphs in which the number of vertices is 4 mod 6. Lindgren's construction consists of a cycle of length 3 mod 6 and a single central vertex; the central vertex is connected to every third vertex of the cycle by edges he calls spokes, and the vertices two positions away from each spoke endpoint are connected to each other. Again, the smallest instance of Lindgren's construction is the Petersen graph.

Additional infinite families are given by Bondy (1972), Doyen & van Diest (1975), and Gutt (1977).

== Enumeration ==
Václav Chvátal proved in 1973 that for all sufficiently large n there exists a hypohamiltonian graph with n vertices. Taking into account subsequent discoveries, “sufficiently large” is now known to mean that such graphs exist for all n ≥ 18. A complete list of hypohamiltonian graphs with at most 17 vertices is known: they are the 10-vertex Petersen graph, a 13-vertex graph and a 15-vertex graph found by computer searches of Herz (1968), and four 16-vertex graphs. There exist at least thirteen 18-vertex hypohamiltonian graphs. By applying the flip-flop method of Chvátal (1973) to the Petersen graph and the flower snark, it is possible to show that the number of hypohamiltonian graphs, and more specifically the number of hypohamiltonian snarks, grows as an exponential function of the number of vertices.

== Generalizations ==
Graph theorists have also studied hypotraceable graphs, graphs that do not contain a Hamiltonian path but such that every subset of n − 1 vertices may be connected by a path. Analogous definitions of hypohamiltonicity and hypotraceability for directed graphs have been considered by several authors.

An equivalent definition of hypohamiltonian graphs is that their longest cycle has length n − 1 and that the intersection of all longest cycles is empty. Menke, Zamfirescu & Zamfirescu (1998) investigate graphs with the same property that the intersection of longest cycles is empty but in which the longest cycle length is shorter than n − 1. Herz (1968) defines the cyclability of a graph as the largest number k such that every k vertices belong to a cycle; the hypohamiltonian graphs are exactly the graphs that have cyclability n − 1. Similarly, Park, Lim & Kim (2007) define a graph to be ƒ-fault hamiltonian if the removal of at most ƒ vertices leaves a Hamiltonian subgraph. Schauerte & Zamfirescu (2006) study the graphs with cyclability n − 2.
