= Cubic graph =

Graph with all vertices of degree 3

The Petersen graph is a cubic graph.

The complete bipartite graph $K_{3,3}$ is an example of a bicubic graph

In the mathematical field of graph theory, a cubic graph is a graph in which all vertices have degree three. In other words, a cubic graph is a 3-regular graph. Cubic graphs are also called trivalent graphs.

A bicubic graph is a cubic bipartite graph.

== Symmetry ==
In 1932, Ronald M. Foster began collecting examples of cubic symmetric graphs, forming the start of the Foster census. Many well-known individual graphs are cubic and symmetric, including the utility graph, the Petersen graph, the Heawood graph, the Möbius–Kantor graph, the Pappus graph, the Desargues graph, the Nauru graph, the Coxeter graph, the Tutte–Coxeter graph, the Dyck graph, the Foster graph and the Biggs–Smith graph. W. T. Tutte classified the symmetric cubic graphs by the smallest integer number s such that each two oriented paths of length s can be mapped to each other by exactly one symmetry of the graph. He showed that s is at most 5, and provided examples of graphs with each possible value of s from 1 to 5.

Semi-symmetric cubic graphs include the Gray graph (the smallest semi-symmetric cubic graph), the Ljubljana graph, and the Tutte 12-cage.

The Frucht graph is one of the five smallest cubic graphs without any symmetries: it possesses only a single graph automorphism, the identity automorphism.

== Coloring and independent sets ==
According to Brooks' theorem every connected cubic graph other than the complete graph K_{4} has a vertex coloring with at most three colors. Therefore, every connected cubic graph other than K_{4} has an independent set of at least n/3 vertices, where n is the number of vertices in the graph: for instance, the largest color class in a 3-coloring has at least this many vertices.

According to Vizing's theorem every cubic graph needs either three or four colors for an edge coloring. A 3-edge-coloring is known as a Tait coloring, and forms a partition of the edges of the graph into three perfect matchings. By Kőnig's line coloring theorem every bicubic graph has a Tait coloring.

The bridgeless cubic graphs that do not have a Tait coloring are known as snarks. They include the Petersen graph, Tietze's graph, the Blanuša snarks, the flower snark, the double-star snark, the Szekeres snark and the Watkins snark. There is an infinite number of distinct snarks.

== Topology and geometry ==
Cubic graphs arise naturally in topology in several ways. For example, the cubic graphs with 2g-2 vertices describe the different ways of cutting a surface of genus g ≥ 2 into pairs of pants. If one considers a graph to be a 1-dimensional CW complex, cubic graphs are generic in that most 1-cell attaching maps are disjoint from the 0-skeleton of the graph. Cubic graphs are also formed as the graphs of simple polyhedra in three dimensions, polyhedra such as the regular dodecahedron with the property that three faces meet at every vertex.

Representation of a planar embedding as a graph-encoded map

An arbitrary graph embedding on a two-dimensional surface may be represented as a cubic graph structure known as a graph-encoded map. In this structure, each vertex of a cubic graph represents a flag of the embedding, a mutually incident triple of a vertex, edge, and face of the surface. The three neighbors of each flag are the three flags that may be obtained from it by changing one of the members of this mutually incident triple and leaving the other two members unchanged.

== Hamiltonicity ==
There has been much research on Hamiltonicity of cubic graphs. In 1880, P.G. Tait conjectured that every cubic polyhedral graph has a Hamiltonian circuit. William Thomas Tutte provided a counter-example to Tait's conjecture, the 46-vertex Tutte graph, in 1946. In 1971, Tutte conjectured that all bicubic graphs are Hamiltonian. However, Joseph Horton provided a counterexample on 96 vertices, the Horton graph. Later, Mark Ellingham constructed two more counterexamples: the Ellingham–Horton graphs. Barnette's conjecture, a still-open combination of Tait's and Tutte's conjecture, states that every bicubic polyhedral graph is Hamiltonian. When a cubic graph is Hamiltonian, LCF notation allows it to be represented concisely.

If a cubic graph is chosen uniformly at random among all n-vertex cubic graphs, then it is very likely to be Hamiltonian: the proportion of the n-vertex cubic graphs that are Hamiltonian tends to one in the limit as n goes to infinity.

David Eppstein conjectured that every n-vertex cubic graph has at most 2^{n/3} (approximately 1.260^{n}) distinct Hamiltonian cycles, and provided examples of cubic graphs with that many cycles. The best proven estimate for the number of distinct Hamiltonian cycles is $O({1.276}^n)$.

== Other properties ==
Unsolved problem in mathematics
What is the largest possible pathwidth of an $n$-vertex cubic graph?
More unsolved problems in mathematics

The pathwidth of any n-vertex cubic graph is at most n/6. The best known lower bound on the pathwidth of cubic graphs is 0.082n. It is not known how to reduce this gap between this lower bound and the n/6 upper bound.

It follows from the handshaking lemma, proven by Leonhard Euler in 1736 as part of the first paper on graph theory, that every cubic graph has an even number of vertices.

Petersen's theorem states that every cubic bridgeless graph has a perfect matching. Lovász and Plummer conjectured that every cubic bridgeless graph has an exponential number of perfect matchings. The conjecture was recently proved, showing that every cubic bridgeless graph with n vertices has at least 2^{n/3656} perfect matchings.

== Algorithms and complexity ==
Several researchers have studied the complexity of exponential time algorithms restricted to cubic graphs. For instance, by applying dynamic programming to a path decomposition of the graph, Fomin and Høie showed how to find their maximum independent sets in time 2^{n/6 + o(n)}. The travelling salesman problem in cubic graphs can be solved in time O(1.2312^{n}) and polynomial space.

Several important graph optimization problems are APX hard, meaning that, although they have approximation algorithms whose approximation ratio is bounded by a constant, they do not have polynomial time approximation schemes whose approximation ratio tends to 1 unless P=NP. These include the problems of finding a minimum vertex cover, maximum independent set, minimum dominating set, and maximum cut. The crossing number (the minimum number of edges which cross in any graph drawing) of a cubic graph is also NP-hard for cubic graphs but may be approximated. The Travelling Salesman Problem on cubic graphs has been proven to be NP-hard to approximate to within any factor less than 1153/1152.

== See also ==
- Table of simple cubic graphs
