= Girth (graph theory) =

Length of a shortest cycle contained in the graph

In graph theory, the girth of an undirected graph is the length of a shortest cycle contained in the graph. If the graph does not contain any cycles (that is, it is a forest), its girth is defined to be infinity. For example, a 4-cycle (square) has girth 4. A grid has girth 4 as well, and a triangular mesh has girth 3. A graph with girth four or more is triangle-free.

== Cages ==
A cubic graph (all vertices have degree three) of girth g that is as small as possible is known as a g-cage (or as a (3,g)-cage). The Petersen graph is the unique 5-cage (it is the smallest cubic graph of girth 5), the Heawood graph is the unique 6-cage, the McGee graph is the unique 7-cage and the Tutte eight cage is the unique 8-cage. There may exist multiple cages for a given girth. For instance there are three nonisomorphic 10-cages, each with 70 vertices: the Balaban 10-cage, the Harries graph and the Harries–Wong graph.

The Petersen graph has a girth of 5

The Heawood graph has a girth of 6

The McGee graph has a girth of 7

The Tutte–Coxeter graph (Tutte eight cage) has a girth of 8

== Girth and graph coloring ==
For any positive integers g and χ, there exists a graph with girth at least g and chromatic number at least χ; for instance, the Grötzsch graph is triangle-free and has chromatic number 4, and repeating the Mycielskian construction used to form the Grötzsch graph produces triangle-free graphs of arbitrarily large chromatic number. Paul Erdős was the first to prove the general result, using the probabilistic method. More precisely, he showed that a random graph on n vertices, formed by choosing independently whether to include each edge with probability n^{(1–g)/g}, has, with probability tending to 1 as n goes to infinity, at most n/2 cycles of length g or less, but has no independent set of size n/2k . Therefore, removing one vertex from each short cycle leaves a smaller graph with girth greater than g, in which each color class of a coloring must be small and which therefore requires at least k colors in any coloring.

Explicit, though large, graphs with high girth and chromatic number can be constructed as certain Cayley graphs of linear groups over finite fields. These remarkable Ramanujan graphs also have large expansion coefficient.

== Related concepts ==
The odd girth and even girth of a graph are the lengths of a shortest odd cycle and shortest even cycle respectively.

The circumference of a graph is the length of the longest (simple) cycle, rather than the shortest.

Thought of as the least length of a non-trivial cycle, the girth admits natural generalisations as the 1-systole or higher systoles in systolic geometry.

Girth is the dual concept to edge connectivity, in the sense that the girth of a planar graph is the edge connectivity of its dual graph, and vice versa. These concepts are unified in matroid theory by the girth of a matroid, the size of the smallest dependent set in the matroid. For a graphic matroid, the matroid girth equals the girth of the underlying graph, while for a co-graphic matroid it equals the edge connectivity.

== Computation ==
The girth of an undirected graph can be computed by running a breadth-first search from each node, with complexity $O(nm)$ where $n$ is the number of vertices of the graph and $m$ is the number of edges. A practical optimization is to limit the depth of the BFS to a depth that depends on the length of the smallest cycle discovered so far. Better algorithms are known in the case where the girth is even and when the graph is planar. In terms of lower bounds, computing the girth of a graph is at least as hard as solving the triangle finding problem on the graph.
