= LCF notation =

Representation of cubic graphs

The Nauru graph has LCF notation [5, −9, 7, −7, 9, −5]^{4}.

In the mathematical field of graph theory, LCF notation or LCF code is a notation devised by Joshua Lederberg, and extended by H. S. M. Coxeter and Robert Frucht, for the representation of cubic graphs that contain a Hamiltonian cycle. The cycle itself includes two out of the three adjacencies for each vertex, and the LCF notation specifies how far along the cycle each vertex's third neighbor is. A single graph may have multiple different representations in LCF notation.

== Description ==
In a Hamiltonian graph, the vertices can be arranged in a cycle, which accounts for two edges per vertex. The third edge from each vertex can then be described by how many positions clockwise (positive) or counter-clockwise (negative) it leads. The basic form of the LCF notation is just the sequence of these numbers of positions, starting from an arbitrarily chosen vertex and written in square brackets. The numbers between the brackets are interpreted modulo N, where N is the number of vertices. Entries congruent modulo N to 0, 1, or N − 1 do not appear in this sequence of numbers, because they would correspond either to a loop or multiple adjacency, neither of which are permitted in simple graphs.

Often the pattern repeats, and the number of repetitions can be indicated by a superscript in the notation. For example, the Nauru graph, shown on the right, has four repetitions of the same six offsets, and can be represented by the LCF notation [5, −9, 7, −7, 9, −5]^{4}. A single graph may have multiple different LCF notations, depending on the choices of Hamiltonian cycle and starting vertex.

== Applications ==
LCF notation is useful in publishing concise descriptions of Hamiltonian cubic graphs, such as the examples below. In addition, some software packages for manipulating graphs include utilities for creating a graph from its LCF notation.

If a graph is represented by LCF notation, it is straightforward to test whether the graph is bipartite: this is true if and only if all of the offsets in the LCF notation are odd.

== Examples ==
Name	Vertices	LCF notation
Tetrahedral graph	4	[2]^{4}
Utility graph	6	[3]^{6}
Cubical graph	8	[3,−3]^{4}
Wagner graph	8	[4]^{8} or [4,−3,3,4]^{2}
Bidiakis cube	12	[6,4,−4]^{4} or [6,−3,3,6,3,−3]^{2} or [−3,6,4,−4,6,3,−4,6,−3,3,6,4]
Franklin graph	12	[5,−5]^{6} or [−5,−3,3,5]^{3}
Frucht graph	12	[−5,−2,−4,2,5,−2,2,5,−2,−5,4,2]
Truncated tetrahedral graph	12	[2,6,−2]^{4}
Heawood graph	14	[5,−5]^{7}
Möbius–Kantor graph	16	[5,−5]^{8}
Pappus graph	18	[5,7,−7,7,−7,−5]^{3}
Smallest zero-symmetric graph	18	[5,−5]^{9}
Desargues graph	20	[5,−5,9,−9]^{5}
Dodecahedral graph	20	[10,7,4,−4,−7,10,−4,7,−7,4]^{2}
McGee graph	24	[12,7,−7]^{8}
Truncated cubical graph	24	[2,9,−2,2,−9,−2]^{4}
Truncated octahedral graph	24	[3,−7,7,−3]^{6}
Nauru graph	24	[5,−9,7,−7,9,−5]^{4}
F26A graph	26	[−7, 7]^{13}
Tutte–Coxeter graph	30	[−13,−9,7,−7,9,13]^{5}
Dyck graph	32	[5,−5,13,−13]^{8}
Gray graph	54	[−25,7,−7,13,−13,25]^{9}
Truncated dodecahedral graph	60	[30, −2, 2, 21, −2, 2, 12, −2, 2, −12, −2, 2, −21, −2, 2, 30, −2, 2, −12, −2, 2, 21, −2, 2, −21, −2, 2, 12, −2, 2]^{2}
Harries graph	70	[−29,−19,−13,13,21,−27,27,33,−13,13,19,−21,−33,29]^{5}
Harries–Wong graph	70	[9, 25, 31, −17, 17, 33, 9, −29, −15, −9, 9, 25, −25, 29, 17, −9, 9, −27, 35, −9, 9, −17, 21, 27, −29, −9, −25, 13, 19, −9, −33, −17, 19, −31, 27, 11, −25, 29, −33, 13, −13, 21, −29, −21, 25, 9, −11, −19, 29, 9, −27, −19, −13, −35, −9, 9, 17, 25, −9, 9, 27, −27, −21, 15, −9, 29, −29, 33, −9, −25]
Balaban 10-cage	70	[−9, −25, −19, 29, 13, 35, −13, −29, 19, 25, 9, −29, 29, 17, 33, 21, 9,−13, −31, −9, 25, 17, 9, −31, 27, −9, 17, −19, −29, 27, −17, −9, −29, 33, −25,25, −21, 17, −17, 29, 35, −29, 17, −17, 21, −25, 25, −33, 29, 9, 17, −27, 29, 19, −17, 9, −27, 31, −9, −17, −25, 9, 31, 13, −9, −21, −33, −17, −29, 29]
Foster graph	90	[17,−9,37,−37,9,−17]^{15}
Biggs–Smith graph	102	[16, 24, −38, 17, 34, 48, −19, 41, −35, 47, −20, 34, −36, 21, 14, 48, −16, −36, −43, 28, −17, 21, 29, −43, 46, −24, 28, −38, −14, −50, −45, 21, 8, 27, −21, 20, −37, 39, −34, −44, −8, 38, −21, 25, 15, −34, 18, −28, −41, 36, 8, −29, −21, −48, −28, −20, −47, 14, −8, −15, −27, 38, 24, −48, −18, 25, 38, 31, −25, 24, −46, −14, 28, 11, 21, 35, −39, 43, 36, −38, 14, 50, 43, 36, −11, −36, −24, 45, 8, 19, −25, 38, 20, −24, −14, −21, −8, 44, −31, −38, −28, 37]
Balaban 11-cage	112	[44, 26, −47, −15, 35, −39, 11, −27, 38, −37, 43, 14, 28, 51, −29, −16, 41, −11, −26, 15, 22, −51, −35, 36, 52, −14, −33, −26, −46, 52, 26, 16, 43, 33, −15, 17, −53, 23, −42, −35, −28, 30, −22, 45, −44, 16, −38, −16, 50, −55, 20, 28, −17, −43, 47, 34, −26, −41, 11, −36, −23, −16, 41, 17, −51, 26, −33, 47, 17, −11, −20, −30, 21, 29, 36, −43, −52, 10, 39, −28, −17, −52, 51, 26, 37, −17, 10, −10, −45, −34, 17, −26, 27, −21, 46, 53, −10, 29, −50, 35, 15, −47, −29, −41, 26, 33, 55, −17, 42, −26, −36, 16]
Ljubljana graph	112	[47, −23, −31, 39, 25, −21, −31, −41, 25, 15, 29, −41, −19, 15, −49, 33, 39, −35, −21, 17, −33, 49, 41, 31, −15, −29, 41, 31, −15, −25, 21, 31, −51, −25, 23, 9, −17, 51, 35, −29, 21, −51, −39, 33, −9, −51, 51, −47, −33, 19, 51, −21, 29, 21, −31, −39]^{2}
Tutte 12-cage	126	[17, 27, −13, −59, −35, 35, −11, 13, −53, 53, −27, 21, 57, 11, −21, −57, 59, −17]^{7}

== Extended LCF notation ==
A more complex extended version of LCF notation was provided by Coxeter, Frucht, and Powers in later work. In particular, they introduced an "anti-palindromic" notation: if the second half of the numbers between the square brackets was the reverse of the first half, but with all the signs changed, then it was replaced by a semicolon and a dash. The Nauru graph satisfies this condition with [5, −9, 7, −7, 9, −5]^{4}, and so can be written [5, −9, 7; −]^{4} in the extended notation.
