= Holt graph =

- In the Holt graph, all vertices are equivalent, and all edges are equivalent, but edges are not equivalent to their inverses.
- Named after: Derek F. Holt
- Vertices: 27
- Edges: 54
- Radius: 3
- Diameter: 3
- Girth: 5
- Automorphisms: 54
- Chromatic number: 3
- Chromatic index: 5
- Book thickness: 3
- Queue number: 3
- Properties: Vertex-transitive; Edge-transitive; Half-transitive; Hamiltonian; Eulerian; Cayley graph

In graph theory, the Holt graph or Doyle graph is the smallest half-transitive graph, that is, the smallest example of a vertex-transitive and edge-transitive graph which is not also symmetric. Such graphs are not common. It is named after Peter G. Doyle and Derek F. Holt, who discovered the same graph independently in 1976 and 1981 respectively.

The Holt graph has diameter 3, radius 3 and girth 5, chromatic number 3, chromatic index 5 and is Hamiltonian with 98,472 distinct Hamiltonian cycles. It is also a 4-vertex-connected and a 4-edge-connected graph. It has book thickness 3 and queue number 3. The graph is not 1-planar.

It has an automorphism group of order 54. This is a smaller group than a symmetric graph with the same number of vertices and edges would have. The graph drawing on the right highlights this, in that it lacks reflectional symmetry.

The characteristic polynomial of the Holt graph is

$$(x^3-6x+2)^6(x+2)^4(x-1)^4(x-4).\$$

== Gallery ==
The chromatic number of the Holt graph is 3.

The chromatic index of the Holt graph is 5.

The Holt graph is Hamiltonian.

The Holt graph is a unit distance graph.
