= Triangle graph =

- The triangle graph
- Vertices: 3
- Edges: 3
- Radius: 1
- Diameter: 1
- Girth: 3
- Automorphisms: 6 (D_{3})
- Chromatic number: 3
- Chromatic index: 3
- Properties: 2-regular Vertex-transitive; Edge-transitive; Unit distance Hamiltonian; Eulerian
- Notation: $C_3$ or $K_3$

In the mathematical field of graph theory, the triangle graph is a planar undirected graph with 3 vertices and 3 edges, in the form of a triangle.

The triangle graph is also known as the cycle graph $C_3$ and the complete graph $K_3$.

== Properties ==
The triangle graph has chromatic number 3, chromatic index 3, radius 1, diameter 1 and girth 3. It is also a 2-vertex-connected graph and a 2-edge-connected graph.

Its chromatic polynomial is $(x-2)(x-1)x.$

== See also ==
- Triangle-free graph
