= F26A graph =

- The F26A graph is Hamiltonian.
- Vertices: 26
- Edges: 39
- Radius: 5
- Diameter: 5
- Girth: 6
- Automorphisms: 78 (C13⋊C6)
- Chromatic number: 2
- Chromatic index: 3
- Properties: Cayley graph Symmetric; Cubic; Hamiltonian

In the mathematical field of graph theory, the F26A graph is a symmetric bipartite cubic graph with 26 vertices and 39 edges.

It has chromatic number 2, chromatic index 3, diameter 5, radius 5 and girth 6. It is also a 3-vertex-connected and 3-edge-connected graph. The graph is 1-planar.

The F26A graph is Hamiltonian and can be described by the LCF notation [−7, 7]^{13}.

== Algebraic properties ==
The automorphism group of the F26A graph is a group of order 78. It acts transitively on the vertices, on the edges, and on the arcs of the graph. Therefore, the F26A graph is a symmetric graph (though not distance transitive). It has automorphisms that take any vertex to any other vertex and any edge to any other edge. According to the Foster census, the F26A graph is the only cubic symmetric graph on 26 vertices. It is also a Cayley graph for the dihedral group D_{26}, generated by a, ab, and ab^{4}, where:

$$D_{26} = \langle a, b | a^2 = b^{13} = 1, aba = b^{-1} \rangle .$$

The F26A graph is the smallest cubic graph where the automorphism group acts regularly on arcs (that is, on edges considered as having a direction).

The characteristic polynomial of the F26A graph is equal to

$$(x-3)(x+3)(x^4-5x^2+3)^6. \,$$

== Other properties ==
The F26A graph can be embedded as a chiral regular map in the torus, with 13 hexagonal faces. The dual graph for this embedding is isomorphic to the Paley graph of order 13.

== Gallery ==
The chromatic number of the F26A graph is 2.

The chromatic index of the F26A graph is 3.

Alternative drawing of the F26A graph.

F26A graph embedded in the torus.
