= Livingstone graph =

- Vertices: 266
- Edges: 1463
- Radius: 4
- Diameter: 4
- Girth: 5
- Automorphisms: 175560 (J_{1})
- Properties: Symmetric; Distance-transitive; Primitive

In the mathematical field of graph theory, the Livingstone graph is a distance-transitive graph with 266 vertices and 1463 edges. Its intersection array is {11,10,6,1;1,1,5,11}. It is the largest distance-transitive graph with degree 11 and diameter ≤ 4.

== Algebraic properties ==
The automorphism group of the Livingstone graph is the sporadic simple group J_{1}, and the stabiliser of a point is PSL(2,11). As the stabiliser is maximal in J_{1}, it acts primitively on the graph.

As the Livingstone graph is distance-transitive, PSL(2,11) acts transitively on the set of 11 vertices adjacent to a reference vertex v, and also on the set of 12 vertices at distance 4 from v. The second action is equivalent to the standard action of PSL(2,11) on the projective line over F_{11}; the first is equivalent to an exceptional action on 11 points, related to the Paley biplane.
