= Pappus graph =

Bipartite, 3-regular undirected graph

- The Pappus graph.
- Named after: Pappus of Alexandria
- Vertices: 18
- Edges: 27
- Radius: 4
- Diameter: 4
- Girth: 6
- Automorphisms: 216
- Chromatic number: 2
- Chromatic index: 3
- Book thickness: 3
- Queue number: 2
- Properties: Bipartite; Symmetric; Distance-transitive; Distance-regular; Cubic; Hamiltonian

In the mathematical field of graph theory, the Pappus graph is a bipartite, 3-regular, undirected graph with 18 vertices and 27 edges, formed as the Levi graph of the Pappus configuration. It is named after Pappus of Alexandria, an ancient Greek mathematician who is believed to have discovered the "hexagon theorem" describing the Pappus configuration. All the cubic, distance-regular graphs are known; the Pappus graph is one of the 13 such graphs.

The Pappus graph has rectilinear crossing number 5, and is the smallest cubic graph with that crossing number (sequence A110507 in the OEIS). It has girth 6, diameter 4, radius 4, chromatic number 2, chromatic index 3 and is both 3-vertex-connected and 3-edge-connected. It has book thickness 3 and queue number 2. The graph is 1-planar.

The Pappus graph has a chromatic polynomial equal to:
$$\begin{align}
(x-1)x(&x^{16} - 26x^{15} \\
&+ 325x^{14} - 2600x^{13} \\
&+ 14950x^{12}- 65762x^{11} \\
&+ 229852x^{10} - 653966x^9 \\
&+ 1537363x^8 - 3008720x^7 \\
&+ 4904386x^6 - 6609926x^5 \\
&+ 7238770x^4 - 6236975x^3 \\
&+ 3989074x^2 - 1690406x + 356509)
\end{align}$$

The name "Pappus graph" has also been used to refer to a related nine-vertex graph, with a vertex for each point of the Pappus configuration and an edge for every pair of points on the same line; this nine-vertex graph is 6-regular, is the complement graph of the union of three disjoint triangle graphs, and is the complete tripartite graph K_{3,3,3}. The first Pappus graph can be embedded in the torus to form a self-Petrie dual regular map with nine hexagonal faces; the second, to form a regular map with 18 triangular faces. The two regular toroidal maps are dual to each other.

== Algebraic properties ==
The automorphism group of the Pappus graph is a group of order 216. It acts transitively on the vertices, on the edges and on the arcs of the graph. Therefore the Pappus graph is a symmetric graph. It has automorphisms that take any vertex to any other vertex and any edge to any other edge. According to the Foster census, the Pappus graph, referenced as F018A, is the only cubic symmetric graph on 18 vertices.

The characteristic polynomial of the Pappus graph is $(x-3) x^4 (x+3) (x^2-3)^6$. It is the only graph with this characteristic polynomial, making it a graph determined by its spectrum.

== Gallery ==
Pappus graph coloured to highlight various cycles.

The chromatic index of the Pappus graph is 3.

The chromatic number of the Pappus graph is 2.

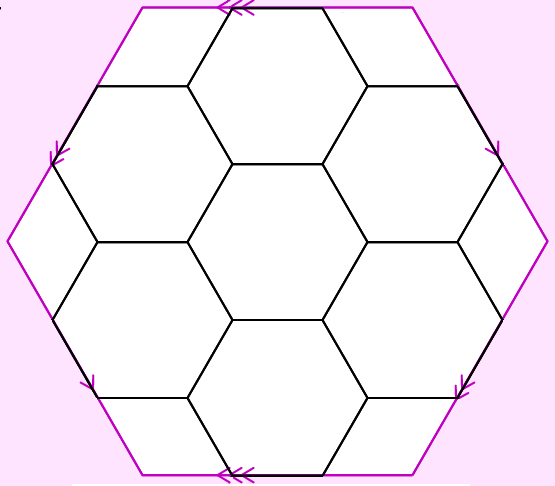
The Pappus graph embedded in the torus, as a regular map with nine hexagonal faces.

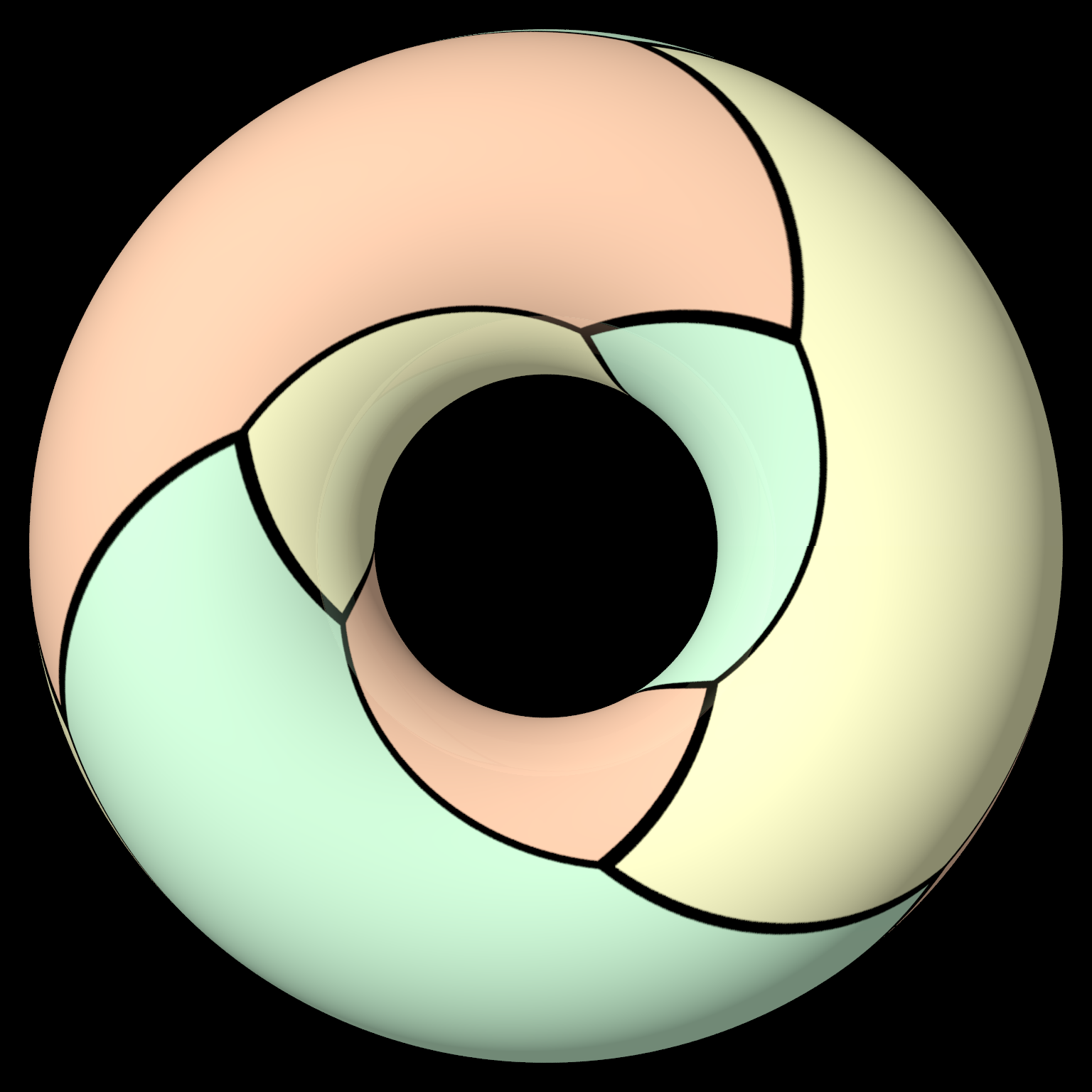
The Pappus graph and associated map embedded in the torus.
