= Bidirected graph =

Graph whose edges are given independent directions at both ends

The different types of edge in a bidirected graph

In the mathematical domain of graph theory, a bidirected graph (introduced by Edmonds & Johnson 1970) is a graph in which each edge is given an independent orientation (or direction, or arrow) at each end.

There are three kinds of bidirected edges: extraverted, where the arrows point outward, towards the vertices, at both ends; introverted, where both arrows point inward, away from the vertices; and directed, in which the two arrows have the same direction (one arrow points away from its vertex and towards the opposite end, while the other arrow points in the same direction as the first, away from the opposite end and towards its own vertex). The bidirected edges of kind directed are the same as ordinary directed edges in a directed graph; thus, a directed graph is a special kind of bidirected graph.

It is sometimes desirable to have also edges with only one end (half-edges); these get only one arrow. An edge with no ends (a loose edge) has no arrows. The edges that are neither half nor loose edges may be called ordinary edges.

A skew-symmetric graph is the double covering graph of a bidirected graph.

A bidirected graph may be regarded as an orientation of a signed graph, similarly to how a directed graph may be viewed as an orientation of an ordinary undirected graph.

== Other meanings ==
A symmetric directed graph (that is, a directed graph in which the reverse of every edge is also an edge) is sometimes also called a "bidirected graph".

== See also ==
- Skew-symmetric graph
- Signed graph
