= Biregular graph =

Graph families defined by their automorphisms
distance-transitive	→	distance-regular	←	strongly regular
- ↓
symmetric (arc-transitive)	←	t-transitive, t ≥ 2		skew-symmetric
- ↓
_{(if connected)} vertex- and edge-transitive	→	edge-transitive and regular	→	edge-transitive
↓		↓		↓
vertex-transitive	→	regular	→	_{(if bipartite)} biregular
- ↑
Cayley graph	←	zero-symmetric		asymmetric

In graph-theoretic mathematics, a biregular graph or semiregular bipartite graph is a bipartite graph $G=(U,V,E)$ for which every two vertices on the same side of the given bipartition have the same degree as each other. If the degree of the vertices in $U$ is $x$ and the degree of the vertices in $V$ is $y$, then the graph is said to be $(x,y)$-biregular.

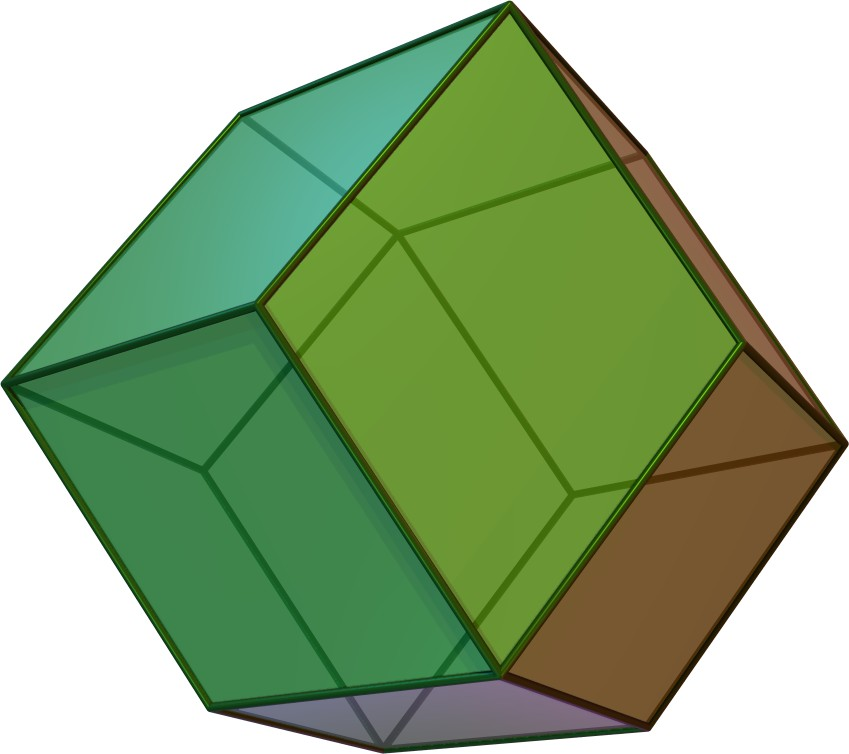
The graph of the rhombic dodecahedron is biregular.

== Example ==
Every complete bipartite graph $K_{a,b}$ is $(b,a)$-biregular. The rhombic dodecahedron is another example; it is (3,4)-biregular.

== Vertex counts ==
An $(x,y)$-biregular graph $G=(U,V,E)$ must satisfy the equation $x|U|=y|V|$. This follows from a simple double counting argument: the number of endpoints of edges in $U$ is $x|U|$, the number of endpoints of edges in $V$ is $y|V|$, and each edge contributes the same amount (one) to both numbers.

== Symmetry ==
Every regular bipartite graph is also biregular. Every edge-transitive graph (disallowing graphs with isolated vertices) that is not also vertex-transitive must be biregular. In particular every edge-transitive graph is either regular or biregular.

== Configurations ==
The Levi graphs of geometric configurations are biregular; a biregular graph is the Levi graph of an (abstract) configuration if and only if its girth is at least six.
