= Cycle graph =

Graph with nodes connected in a closed chain

- The cycle graph C_{5}
- Girth: n
- Automorphisms: 2n (D_{n})
- Chromatic number: 3 if n is odd 2 otherwise
- Chromatic index: 3 if n is odd 2 otherwise
- Spectrum: $\left\{ 2\cos\left(\frac{2k\pi}{n}\right); k=1,\cdots,n \right\}$
- Properties: 2-regular Vertex-transitive; Edge-transitive; Unit distance Hamiltonian; Eulerian; Polytopal
- Notation: C_{n}

In graph theory, a cycle graph or circular graph is a graph that consists of a single cycle, or in other words, some number of vertices (at least 3, if the graph is simple) connected in a closed chain. The cycle graph with n vertices is called C_{n}. The number of vertices in C_{n} equals the number of edges, and every vertex has degree 2; that is, every vertex has exactly two edges incident with it.

Cycle graph $C_1$ is an isolated loop. Cycle graph $C_3$ is the same as complete graph $K_3$.

== Terminology ==
There are many synonyms for "cycle graph". These include simple cycle graph and cyclic graph, although the latter term is less often used, because it can also refer to graphs which are merely not acyclic. Among graph theorists, cycle, polygon, or n-gon are also often used. The term n-cycle is sometimes used in other settings.

A cycle with an even number of vertices is called an even cycle; a cycle with an odd number of vertices is called an odd cycle.

== Properties ==
A cycle graph is:

- 2-edge colorable, if and only if it has an even number of vertices
- 2-regular
- 2-vertex colorable, if and only if it has an even number of vertices. More generally, a graph is bipartite if and only if it has no odd cycles (Kőnig, 1936).
- Connected
- Eulerian
- Hamiltonian
- A unit distance graph

In addition:

- As cycle graphs can be drawn as regular polygons, the symmetries of an n-cycle are the same as those of a regular polygon with n sides, the dihedral group of order 2n. In particular, there exist symmetries taking any vertex to any other vertex, and any edge to any other edge, so the n-cycle is a symmetric graph.

Similarly to the Platonic graphs, the cycle graphs form the skeletons of the dihedra. Their duals are the dipole graphs, which form the skeletons of the hosohedra.

== Directed cycle graph ==
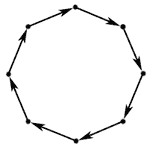
A directed cycle graph of length 8

A directed cycle graph is a directed version of a cycle graph, with all the edges being oriented in the same direction.

In a directed graph, a set of edges which contains at least one edge (or arc) from each directed cycle is called a feedback arc set. Similarly, a set of vertices containing at least one vertex from each directed cycle is called a feedback vertex set.

A directed cycle graph has uniform in-degree 1 and uniform out-degree 1.

Directed cycle graphs are Cayley graphs for cyclic groups (see e.g. Trevisan).

== See also ==
- Complete bipartite graph
- Complete graph
- Circulant graph
- Cycle graph (algebra)
- Null graph
- Path graph

== Sources ==
- Diestel, Reinhard (2017). Graph Theory (5 ed.). Springer. ISBN 978-3-662-53621-6.
