= Tutte–Coxeter graph =

3-regular graph with 30 vertices and 45 edges

- Named after: W. T. Tutte; H. S. M. Coxeter
- Vertices: 30
- Edges: 45
- Radius: 4
- Diameter: 4
- Girth: 8
- Automorphisms: 1440 (Aut(S_{6}))
- Chromatic number: 2
- Chromatic index: 3
- Book thickness: 3
- Queue number: 2
- Properties: Cubic; Cage; Moore graph Symmetric; Distance-regular; Distance-transitive; Bipartite

In the mathematical field of graph theory, the Tutte–Coxeter graph or Tutte eight-cage or Cremona–Richmond graph is a 3-regular graph with 30 vertices and 45 edges. As the unique smallest cubic graph of girth 8, it is a cage and a Moore graph. It is bipartite, and can be constructed as the Levi graph of the generalized quadrangle W_{2} (known as the Cremona–Richmond configuration). The graph is named after William Thomas Tutte and H. S. M. Coxeter; it was discovered by Tutte (1947) but its connection to geometric configurations was investigated by both authors in a pair of jointly published papers (Tutte 1958; Coxeter 1958a).

All the cubic distance-regular graphs are known. The Tutte–Coxeter is one of the 13 such graphs.

It has crossing number 13, book thickness 3 and queue number 2.

== Constructions and automorphisms ==
The Tutte–Coxeter graph is the bipartite Levi graph connecting the 15 perfect matchings of a 6-vertex complete graph K_{6} to its 15 edges, as described by Coxeter (1958b), based on work by Sylvester (1844). Each vertex corresponds to an edge or a perfect matching, and connected vertices represent the incidence structure between edges and matchings.

Based on this construction, Coxeter showed that the Tutte–Coxeter graph is a symmetric graph; it has a group of 1440 automorphisms, which may be identified with the automorphisms of the group of permutations on six elements (Coxeter 1958b). The inner automorphisms of this group correspond to permuting the six vertices of the K_{6} graph; these permutations act on the Tutte–Coxeter graph by permuting the vertices on each side of its bipartition while keeping each of the two sides fixed as a set. In addition, the outer automorphisms of the group of permutations swap one side of the bipartition for the other. As Coxeter showed, any path of up to five edges in the Tutte–Coxeter graph is equivalent to any other such path by one such automorphism.

== The Tutte–Coxeter graph as a building ==
This graph is the spherical building associated to the symplectic group $Sp_4(\mathbb{F}_{2})$ (there is an exceptional isomorphism between this group and the symmetric group $S_6$). More specifically, it is the incidence graph of a generalized quadrangle.

Concretely, the Tutte-Coxeter graph can be defined from a 4-dimensional symplectic vector space $V$ over $\mathbb{F}_{2}$ as follows:

- vertices are either nonzero vectors, or isotropic 2-dimensional subspaces,
- there is an edge between a nonzero vector v and an isotropic 2-dimensional subspace $W\subset V$ if and only if $v \in W$.

== Gallery ==
The chromatic number of the Tutte–Coxeter graph is 2.

The chromatic index of the Tutte–Coxeter graph is 3.
