= Skew-symmetric graph =

Directed graph isomorphic to its own transpose graph

Graph families defined by their automorphisms
| distance-transitive | → | distance-regular | ← | strongly regular |
- ↓
| symmetric (arc-transitive) | ← | t-transitive, t ≥ 2 | | skew-symmetric |
- ↓
| _{(if connected)} vertex- and edge-transitive | → | edge-transitive and regular | → | edge-transitive |
| ↓ | | ↓ | | ↓ |
| vertex-transitive | → | regular | → | _{(if bipartite)} biregular |
- ↑
| Cayley graph | ← | zero-symmetric | | asymmetric |

In graph theory, a branch of mathematics, a skew-symmetric graph is a directed graph that is isomorphic to its own transpose graph, the graph formed by reversing all of its edges, under an isomorphism that is an involution without any fixed points. Skew-symmetric graphs are identical to the double covering graphs of bidirected graphs.

Skew-symmetric graphs were first introduced under the name of antisymmetrical digraphs by Tutte (1967), later as the double covering graphs of polar graphs by Zelinka (1976b), and still later as the double covering graphs of bidirected graphs by Zaslavsky (1991). They arise in modeling the search for alternating paths and alternating cycles in algorithms for finding matchings in graphs, in testing whether a still life pattern in Conway's Game of Life may be partitioned into simpler components, in graph drawing, and in the implication graphs used to efficiently solve the 2-satisfiability problem.

== Definition ==
As defined, e.g., by Goldberg & Karzanov (1996), a skew-symmetric graph G is a directed graph, together with a function σ mapping vertices of G to other vertices of G, satisfying the following properties:

1. For every vertex v, σ(v) ≠ v,
2. For every vertex v, σ(σ(v)) = v,
3. For every edge (u,v), (σ(v),σ(u)) must also be an edge.

One may use the third property to extend σ to an orientation-reversing function on the edges of G.

The transpose graph of G is the graph formed by reversing every edge of G, and σ defines a graph isomorphism from G to its transpose. However, in a skew-symmetric graph, it is additionally required that the isomorphism pair each vertex with a different vertex, rather than allowing a vertex to be mapped to itself by the isomorphism or to group more than two vertices in a cycle of isomorphism.

A path or cycle in a skew-symmetric graph is said to be regular if, for each vertex v of the path or cycle, the corresponding vertex σ(v) is not part of the path or cycle.

== Examples ==
Every directed path graph with an even number of vertices is skew-symmetric, via a symmetry that swaps the two ends of the path. However, path graphs with an odd number of vertices are not skew-symmetric, because the orientation-reversing symmetry of these graphs maps the center vertex of the path to itself, something that is not allowed for skew-symmetric graphs.

Similarly, a directed cycle graph is skew-symmetric if and only if it has an even number of vertices. In this case, the number of different mappings σ that realize the skew symmetry of the graph equals half the length of the cycle.

== Polar/switch graphs, double covering graphs, and bidirected graphs ==
A skew-symmetric graph may equivalently be defined as the double covering graph of a polar graph or switch graph, which is an undirected graph in which the edges incident to each vertex are partitioned into two subsets. Each vertex of the polar graph corresponds to two vertices of the skew-symmetric graph, and each edge of the polar graph corresponds to two edges of the skew-symmetric graph. This equivalence is the one used by Goldberg & Karzanov (1996) to model problems of matching in terms of skew-symmetric graphs; in that application, the two subsets of edges at each vertex are the unmatched edges and the matched edges. Zelinka (following F. Zitek) and Cook visualize the vertices of a polar graph as points where multiple tracks of a train track come together: if a train enters a switch via a track that comes in from one direction, it must exit via a track in the other direction. The problem of finding non-self-intersecting smooth curves between given points in a train track comes up in testing whether certain kinds of graph drawings are valid. and may be modeled as the search for a regular path in a skew-symmetric graph.

A closely related concept is the bidirected graph or polarized graph, a graph in which each of the two ends of each edge may be either a head or a tail, independently of the other end. A bidirected graph may be interpreted as a polar graph by letting the partition of edges at each vertex be determined by the partition of endpoints at that vertex into heads and tails; however, swapping the roles of heads and tails at a single vertex ("switching" the vertex) produces a different bidirected graph but the same polar graph.

To form the double covering graph (i.e., the corresponding skew-symmetric graph) from a polar graph G, create for each vertex v of G two vertices v_{0} and v_{1}, and let σ(v_{i}) = v_{1 − i}. For each edge e = (u,v) of G, create two directed edges in the covering graph, one oriented from u to v and one oriented from v to u. If e is in the first subset of edges at v, these two edges are from u_{0} into v_{0} and from v_{1} into u_{1}, while if e is in the second subset, the edges are from u_{0} into v_{1} and from v_{0} into u_{1}. In the other direction, given a skew-symmetric graph G, one may form a polar graph that has one vertex for every corresponding pair of vertices in G and one undirected edge for every corresponding pair of edges in G. The undirected edges at each vertex of the polar graph may be partitioned into two subsets according to which vertex of the polar graph they go out of and come into.

A regular path or cycle of a skew-symmetric graph corresponds to a path or cycle in the polar graph that uses at most one edge from each subset of edges at each of its vertices.

== Matching ==
In constructing matchings in undirected graphs, it is important to find alternating paths, paths of vertices that start and end at unmatched vertices, in which the edges at odd positions in the path are not part of a given partial matching and in which the edges at even positions in the path are part of the matching. By removing the matched edges of such a path from a matching, and adding the unmatched edges, one can increase the size of the matching. Similarly, cycles that alternate between matched and unmatched edges are of importance in weighted matching problems. An alternating path or cycle in an undirected graph may be modeled as a regular path or cycle in a skew-symmetric directed graph. To create a skew-symmetric graph from an undirected graph G with a specified matching M, view G as a switch graph in which the edges at each vertex are partitioned into matched and unmatched edges; an alternating path in G is then a regular path in this switch graph and an alternating cycle in G is a regular cycle in the switch graph.

Goldberg & Karzanov (1996) generalized alternating path algorithms to show that the existence of a regular path between any two vertices of a skew-symmetric graph may be tested in linear time. Given additionally a non-negative length function on the edges of the graph that assigns the same length to any edge e and to σ(e), the shortest regular path connecting a given pair of nodes in a skew-symmetric graph with m edges and n vertices may be tested in time O(m log n). If the length function is allowed to have negative lengths, the existence of a negative regular cycle may be tested in polynomial time.

Along with the path problems arising in matchings, skew-symmetric generalizations of the max-flow min-cut theorem have also been studied.

== Still life theory ==
Cook (2003) shows that a still life pattern in Conway's Game of Life may be partitioned into two smaller still lifes if and only if an associated switch graph contains a regular cycle. As he shows, for switch graphs with at most three edges per vertex, this may be tested in polynomial time by repeatedly removing bridges (edges the removal of which disconnects the graph) and vertices at which all edges belong to a single partition until no more such simplifications may be performed. If the result is an empty graph, there is no regular cycle; otherwise, a regular cycle may be found in any remaining bridgeless component. The repeated search for bridges in this algorithm may be performed efficiently using a dynamic graph algorithm of Thorup (2000).

Similar bridge-removal techniques in the context of matching were previously considered by Gabow, Kaplan & Tarjan (1999).

== Satisfiability ==
An implication graph. Its skew symmetry can be realized by rotating the graph through a 180 degree angle and reversing all edges.

An instance of the 2-satisfiability problem, that is, a Boolean expression in conjunctive normal form with two variables or negations of variables per clause, may be transformed into an implication graph by replacing each clause $\scriptstyle u\lor v$ by the two implications $\scriptstyle(\lnot u)\Rightarrow v$ and $\scriptstyle(\lnot v)\Rightarrow u$. This graph has a vertex for each variable or negated variable, and a directed edge for each implication; it is, by construction, skew-symmetric, with a correspondence σ that maps each variable to its negation. As Aspvall, Plass & Tarjan (1979) showed, a satisfying assignment to the 2-satisfiability instance is equivalent to a partition of this implication graph into two subsets of vertices, S and σ(S), such that no edge starts in S and ends in σ(S). If such a partition exists, a satisfying assignment may be formed by assigning a true value to every variable in S and a false value to every variable in σ(S). This may be done if and only if no strongly connected component of the graph contains both some vertex v and its complementary vertex σ(v). If two vertices belong to the same strongly connected component, the corresponding variables or negated variables are constrained to equal each other in any satisfying assignment of the 2-satisfiability instance. The total time for testing strong connectivity and finding a partition of the implication graph is linear in the size of the given 2-CNF expression.

== Recognition ==
It is NP-complete to determine whether a given directed graph is skew-symmetric, by a result of Lalonde (1981) that it is NP-complete to find a color-reversing involution in a bipartite graph. Such an involution exists if and only if the directed graph given by orienting each edge from one color class to the other is skew-symmetric, so testing skew-symmetry of this directed graph is hard. This complexity does not affect path-finding algorithms for skew-symmetric graphs, because these algorithms assume that the skew-symmetric structure is given as part of the input to the algorithm rather than requiring it to be inferred from the graph alone.
