= Heawood graph =

Undirected graph with 14 vertices

- Named after: Percy John Heawood
- Vertices: 14
- Edges: 21
- Radius: 3
- Diameter: 3
- Girth: 6
- Automorphisms: 336 (PGL_{2}(7))
- Chromatic number: 2
- Chromatic index: 3
- Genus: 1
- Book thickness: 3
- Queue number: 2
- Properties: Bipartite; Cubic; Cage; Distance-transitive; Distance-regular; Toroidal; Hamiltonian; Symmetric; Orientably simple

In the mathematical field of graph theory, the Heawood graph is an undirected graph with 14 vertices and 21 edges, named after Percy John Heawood.

== Combinatorial properties ==
The graph is cubic, and all cycles in the graph have six or more edges. Every smaller cubic graph has shorter cycles, so this graph is the 6-cage, the smallest cubic graph of girth 6. It is a distance-transitive graph (see the Foster census) and therefore distance regular.

There are 24 perfect matchings in the Heawood graph; for each matching, the set of edges not in the matching forms a Hamiltonian cycle. For instance, the figure shows the vertices of the graph placed on a cycle, with the internal diagonals of the cycle forming a matching. By subdividing the cycle edges into two matchings, we can partition the Heawood graph into three perfect matchings (that is, 3-color its edges) in eight different ways. Every two perfect matchings, and every two Hamiltonian cycles, can be transformed into each other by a symmetry of the graph.

There are 28 six-vertex cycles in the Heawood graph. Each 6-cycle is disjoint from exactly three other 6-cycles; among these three 6-cycles, each one is the symmetric difference of the other two. The graph with one node per 6-cycle, and one edge for each disjoint pair of 6-cycles, is the Coxeter graph.

== Geometric and topological properties ==
Heawood's map. Opposite edges of the large hexagon are connected to form a torus.

The Heawood graph is a toroidal graph; that is, it can be embedded without crossings onto a torus. The result is the regular map {6,3}_{2,1}, with 7 hexagonal faces. Each face of the map is adjacent to every other face, thus as a result coloring the map requires 7 colors. The map and graph were discovered by Percy John Heawood in 1890, who proved that no map on the torus could require more than seven colors and thus this map is maximal.

The map can be faithfully realized as the Szilassi polyhedron, the only known polyhedron apart from the tetrahedron such that every pair of faces is adjacent.

Fano plane and two representations of its Levi graph (below as a bipartite graph)

The Heawood graph is the Levi graph of the Fano plane, the graph representing incidences between points and lines in that geometry. With this interpretation, the 6-cycles in the Heawood graph correspond to triangles in the Fano plane. Also, the Heawood graph is the Tits building of the group SL_{3}(F_{2}).

The Heawood graph has crossing number 3, and is the smallest cubic graph with that crossing number (sequence A110507 in the OEIS). Including the Heawood graph, there are 8 distinct graphs of order 14 with crossing number 3.

The Heawood graph is the smallest cubic graph with Colin de Verdière graph invariant μ = 6.

The Heawood graph is a unit distance graph: it can be embedded in the plane such that adjacent vertices are exactly at distance one apart, with no two vertices embedded to the same point and no vertex embedded into a point within an edge.

== Algebraic properties ==
The automorphism group of the Heawood graph is isomorphic to the projective linear group PGL_{2}(7), a group of order 336. It acts transitively on the vertices, on the edges and on the arcs of the graph. Therefore, the Heawood graph is a symmetric graph. It has automorphisms that take any vertex to any other vertex and any edge to any other edge. More strongly, the Heawood graph is 4-arc-transitive. According to the Foster census, the Heawood graph, referenced as F014A, is the only cubic symmetric graph on 14 vertices.

It has book thickness 3 and queue number 2.

The characteristic polynomial of the Heawood graph is $(x-3) (x+3) (x^2-2)^6$. It is the only graph with this characteristic polynomial, making it a graph determined by its spectrum.

== Gallery ==
crossing number 3 and 1-planar

chromatic index 3

chromatic number 2

embedded in a torus (shown as a square)

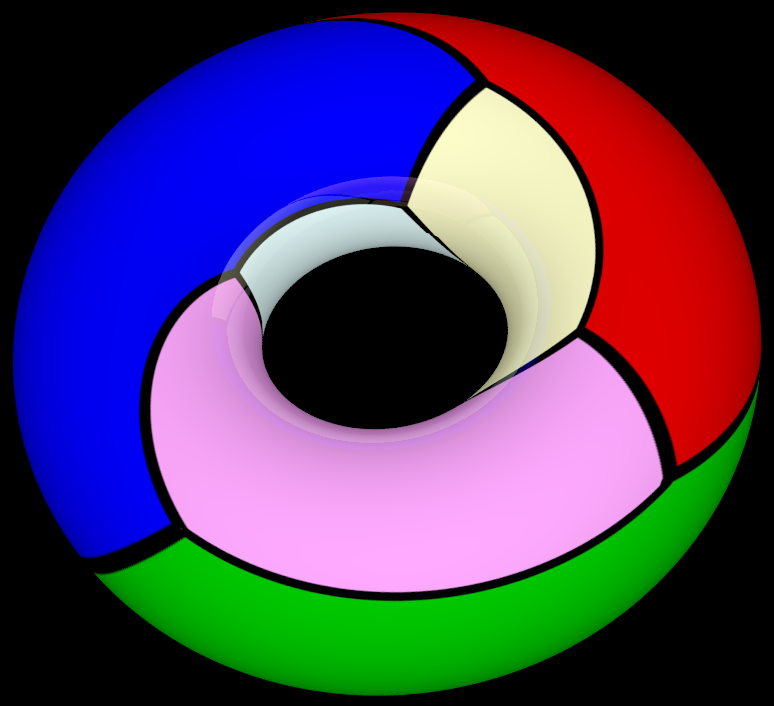
embedded in a torus (compare video)

Szilassi polyhedron
