= Distance-regular graph =

Graph property

Graph families defined by their automorphisms
distance-transitive	→	distance-regular	←	strongly regular
- ↓
symmetric (arc-transitive)	←	t-transitive, t ≥ 2		skew-symmetric
- ↓
_{(if connected)} vertex- and edge-transitive	→	edge-transitive and regular	→	edge-transitive
↓		↓		↓
vertex-transitive	→	regular	→	_{(if bipartite)} biregular
- ↑
Cayley graph	←	zero-symmetric		asymmetric

In the mathematical field of graph theory, a distance-regular graph is a regular graph such that for any two vertices v and w, the number of vertices at distance j from v and at distance k from w depends only upon j, k, and the distance between v and w.

Some authors exclude the complete graphs and disconnected graphs from this definition.

Every distance-transitive graph is distance regular. Indeed, distance-regular graphs were introduced as a combinatorial generalization of distance-transitive graphs, having the numerical regularity properties of the latter without necessarily having a large automorphism group.

== Intersection arrays ==
The intersection array of a distance-regular graph is the array $( b_0, b_1, \ldots, b_{d-1}; c_1, \ldots, c_d )$ in which $d$ is the diameter of the graph and for each $1 \leq j \leq d$, $b_j$ gives the number of neighbours of $u$ at distance $j+1$ from $v$ and $c_j$ gives the number of neighbours of $u$ at distance $j - 1$ from $v$ for any pair of vertices $u$ and $v$ at distance $j$. There is also the number $a_j$ that gives the number of neighbours of $u$ at distance $j$ from $v$. The numbers $a_j, b_j, c_j$ are called the intersection numbers of the graph. They satisfy the equation $a_j + b_j + c_j = k,$ where $k = b_0$ is the valency, i.e., the number of neighbours, of any vertex.

It turns out that a graph $G$ of diameter $d$ is distance regular if and only if it has an intersection array in the preceding sense.

== Cospectral and disconnected distance-regular graphs ==
A pair of connected distance-regular graphs are cospectral if their adjacency matrices have the same spectrum. This is equivalent to their having the same intersection array.

A distance-regular graph is disconnected if and only if it is a disjoint union of cospectral distance-regular graphs.

== Properties ==
Suppose $G$ is a connected distance-regular graph of valency $k$ with intersection array $( b_0, b_1, \ldots, b_{d-1}; c_1, \ldots, c_d )$. For each $0 \leq j \leq d,$ let $k_j$ denote the number of vertices at distance $j$ from any given vertex and let $G_{j}$ denote the $k_{j}$-regular graph with adjacency matrix $A_j$ formed by relating pairs of vertices on $G$ at distance $j$.

=== Graph-theoretic properties ===
- $\frac{k_{j+1}}{k_{j}} = \frac{b_{j}}{c_{j+1}}$ for all $0 \leq j < d$.
- $b_0 > b_1 \geq \cdots \geq b_{d-1} > 0$ and $1 = c_1 \leq \cdots \leq c_d \leq b_0$.

=== Spectral properties ===
- $G$ has $d + 1$ distinct eigenvalues.
- The only simple eigenvalue of $G$ is $k,$ or both $k$ and $-k$ if $G$ is bipartite.
- $k \leq \frac{1}{2} (m - 1)(m + 2)$ for any eigenvalue multiplicity $m > 1$ of $G,$ unless $G$ is a complete multipartite graph.
- $d \leq 3m - 4$ for any eigenvalue multiplicity $m > 1$ of $G,$ unless $G$ is a cycle graph or a complete multipartite graph.

If $G$ is strongly regular, then $n \leq 4m - 1$ and $k \leq 2m - 1$.

=== Association scheme ===
The $i$-distance adjacency matrices $A_i$ for $i = 0, 1, ..., d$ of a distance-regular graph form an association scheme.

== Examples ==
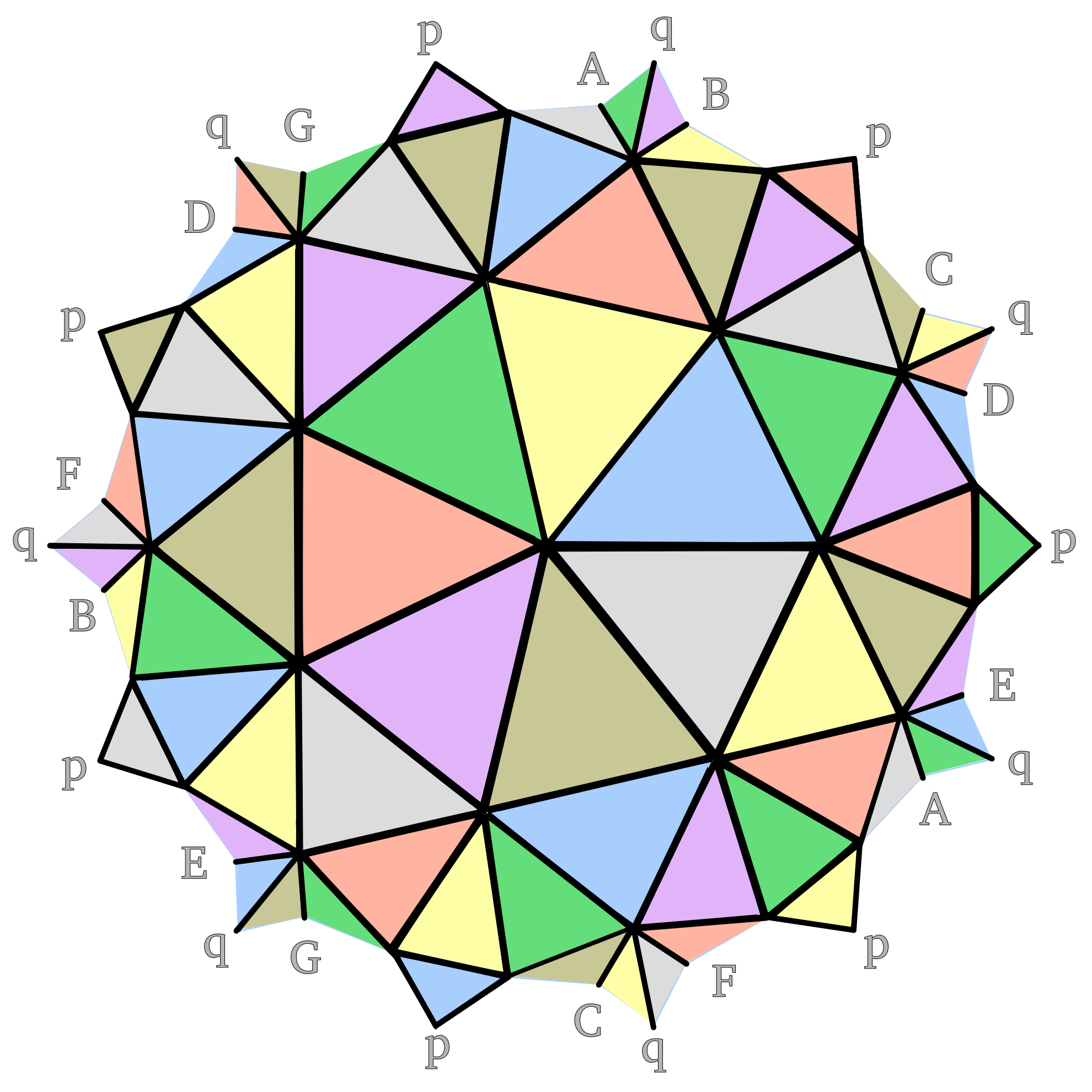
The degree 7 Klein graph and associated map embedded in an orientable surface of genus 3. This graph is distance regular with intersection array {7,4,1;1,2,7} and automorphism group PGL(2,7).

Some first examples of distance-regular graphs include:

- The complete graphs.
- The cycle graphs.
- The odd graphs.
- The Moore graphs.
- The collinearity graph of a regular near polygon.
- The Wells graph and the Sylvester graph.
- Strongly regular graphs are the distance-regular graphs of diameter 2.

== Classification of distance-regular graphs ==
There are only finitely many distinct connected distance-regular graphs of any given valency $k > 2$.

Similarly, there are only finitely many distinct connected distance-regular graphs with any given eigenvalue multiplicity $m > 2$ (with the exception of the complete multipartite graphs).

=== Cubic distance-regular graphs ===
The cubic distance-regular graphs have been completely classified.

The 13 distinct cubic distance-regular graphs are K_{4} (or Tetrahedral graph), K_{3,3}, the Petersen graph, the Cubical graph, the Heawood graph, the Pappus graph, the Coxeter graph, the Tutte–Coxeter graph, the Dodecahedral graph, the Desargues graph, Tutte 12-cage, the Biggs–Smith graph, and the Foster graph.
