= Symmetric graph =

Graph in which all ordered pairs of linked nodes are automorphic

Graph families defined by their automorphisms
distance-transitive	→	distance-regular	←	strongly regular
- ↓
symmetric (arc-transitive)	←	t-transitive, t ≥ 2		skew-symmetric
- ↓
_{(if connected)} vertex- and edge-transitive	→	edge-transitive and regular	→	edge-transitive
↓		↓		↓
vertex-transitive	→	regular	→	_{(if bipartite)} biregular
- ↑
Cayley graph	←	zero-symmetric		asymmetric

The Petersen graph is a (cubic) symmetric graph. Any pair of adjacent vertices can be mapped to another by an automorphism, since any five-vertex ring can be mapped to any other.

In the mathematical field of graph theory, a graph G is symmetric or arc-transitive if, given any two ordered pairs of adjacent vertices $(u_1,v_1)$ and $(u_2,v_2)$ of G, there is an automorphism

$$f : V(G) \rightarrow V(G)$$

such that

$f(u_1) = u_2$ and $f(v_1) = v_2.$

In other words, a graph is symmetric if its automorphism group acts transitively on ordered pairs of adjacent vertices (that is, upon edges considered as having a direction). Such a graph is sometimes also called 1-arc-transitive or flag-transitive.

By definition (ignoring u_{1} and u_{2}), a symmetric graph without isolated vertices must also be vertex-transitive. Since the definition above maps one edge to another, a symmetric graph must also be edge-transitive. However, an edge-transitive graph need not be symmetric, since a—b might map to c—d, but not to d—c. Star graphs are a simple example of being edge-transitive without being vertex-transitive or symmetric. As a further example, semi-symmetric graphs are edge-transitive and regular, but not vertex-transitive.

Every connected symmetric graph must thus be both vertex-transitive and edge-transitive, and the converse is true for graphs of odd degree. However, for even degree, there exist connected graphs which are vertex-transitive and edge-transitive, but not symmetric. Such graphs are called half-transitive. The smallest connected half-transitive graph is Holt's graph, with degree 4 and 27 vertices. Confusingly, some authors use the term "symmetric graph" to mean a graph which is vertex-transitive and edge-transitive, rather than an arc-transitive graph. Such a definition would include half-transitive graphs, which are excluded under the definition above.

A distance-transitive graph is one where instead of considering pairs of adjacent vertices (i.e. vertices a distance of 1 apart), the definition covers two pairs of vertices, each the same distance apart. Such graphs are automatically symmetric, by definition.

A t-arc is defined to be a sequence of t + 1 vertices, such that any two consecutive vertices in the sequence are adjacent, and with any repeated vertices being more than 2 steps apart. A t-transitive graph is a graph such that the automorphism group acts transitively on t-arcs, but not on (t + 1)-arcs. Since 1-arcs are simply edges, every symmetric graph of degree 3 or more must be t-transitive for some t, and the value of t can be used to further classify symmetric graphs. The cube is 2-transitive, for example.

Note that conventionally the term "symmetric graph" is not complementary to the term "asymmetric graph," as the latter refers to a graph that has no nontrivial symmetries at all.

== Examples ==
Two basic families of symmetric graphs for any number of vertices are the cycle graphs (of degree 2) and the complete graphs. Further symmetric graphs are formed by the vertices and edges of the regular and quasiregular polyhedra: the cube, octahedron, icosahedron, dodecahedron, cuboctahedron, and icosidodecahedron. Extension of the cube to n dimensions gives the hypercube graphs (with 2^{n} vertices and degree n). Similarly extension of the octahedron to n dimensions gives the graphs of the cross-polytopes, this family of graphs (with 2n vertices and degree 2n − 2) are sometimes referred to as the cocktail party graphs - they are complete graphs with a set of edges making a perfect matching removed. Additional families of symmetric graphs with an even number of vertices 2n, are the evenly split complete bipartite graphs K_{n,n} and the crown graphs on 2n vertices. Many other symmetric graphs can be classified as circulant graphs (but not all).

The Rado graph forms an example of a symmetric graph with infinitely many vertices and infinite degree.

=== Cubic symmetric graphs ===
Combining the symmetry condition with the restriction that graphs be cubic (i.e. all vertices have degree 3) yields quite a strong condition, and such graphs are rare enough to be listed. They all have an even number of vertices. The Foster census and its extensions provide such lists. The Foster census was begun in the 1930s by Ronald M. Foster while he was employed by Bell Labs, and in 1988 (when Foster was 92) the then current Foster census (listing all cubic symmetric graphs up to 512 vertices) was published in book form. The first thirteen items in the list are cubic symmetric graphs with up to 30 vertices (ten of these are also distance-transitive; the exceptions are as indicated):

Vertices	Diameter	Girth	Graph	Notes
4	1	3	The complete graph K_{4}	distance-transitive, 2-arc-transitive
6	2	4	The complete bipartite graph K_{3,3}	distance-transitive, 3-arc-transitive
8	3	4	The vertices and edges of the cube	distance-transitive, 2-arc-transitive
10	2	5	The Petersen graph	distance-transitive, 3-arc-transitive
14	3	6	The Heawood graph	distance-transitive, 4-arc-transitive
16	4	6	The Möbius–Kantor graph	2-arc-transitive
18	4	6	The Pappus graph	distance-transitive, 3-arc-transitive
20	5	5	The vertices and edges of the dodecahedron	distance-transitive, 2-arc-transitive
20	5	6	The Desargues graph	distance-transitive, 3-arc-transitive
24	4	6	The Nauru graph (the generalized Petersen graph G(12,5))	2-arc-transitive
26	5	6	The F26A graph	1-arc-transitive
28	4	7	The Coxeter graph	distance-transitive, 3-arc-transitive
30	4	8	The Tutte–Coxeter graph	distance-transitive, 5-arc-transitive

Other well known cubic symmetric graphs are the Dyck graph, the Foster graph and the Biggs–Smith graph. The ten distance-transitive graphs listed above, together with the Foster graph and the Biggs–Smith graph, are the only cubic distance-transitive graphs.

== Properties ==
The vertex-connectivity of a symmetric graph is always equal to the degree d. In contrast, for vertex-transitive graphs in general, the vertex-connectivity is bounded below by 2(d + 1)/3.

A t-transitive graph of degree 3 or more has girth at least 2(t − 1). However, there are no finite t-transitive graphs of degree 3 or more for t ≥ 8. In the case of the degree being exactly 3 (cubic symmetric graphs), there are none for t ≥ 6.

== See also ==
- Algebraic graph theory
- Gallery of named graphs
- Regular map
