= Distance-transitive graph =

Graph where any two nodes of equal distance are isomorphic

Graph families defined by their automorphisms
distance-transitive	→	distance-regular	←	strongly regular
- ↓
symmetric (arc-transitive)	←	t-transitive, t ≥ 2		skew-symmetric
- ↓
_{(if connected)} vertex- and edge-transitive	→	edge-transitive and regular	→	edge-transitive
↓		↓		↓
vertex-transitive	→	regular	→	_{(if bipartite)} biregular
- ↑
Cayley graph	←	zero-symmetric		asymmetric

The Biggs-Smith graph, the largest 3-regular distance-transitive graph.

In the mathematical field of graph theory, a distance-transitive graph is a graph such that, given any two vertices v and w at any distance i, and any other two vertices x and y at the same distance, there is an automorphism of the graph that carries v to x and w to y. Distance-transitive graphs were first defined in 1971 by Norman L. Biggs and D. H. Smith.

A distance-transitive graph is interesting partly because it has a large automorphism group. Some interesting finite groups are the automorphism groups of distance-transitive graphs, especially of those whose diameter is 2.

== Examples ==
Some first examples of families of distance-transitive graphs include:

- The Johnson graphs.
- The Grassmann graphs.
- The Hamming Graphs (including Hypercube graphs).
- The folded cube graphs.
- The square rook's graphs.
- The Livingstone graph.

== Classification of cubic distance-transitive graphs ==
After introducing them in 1971, Biggs and Smith showed that there are only 12 finite connected trivalent distance-transitive graphs. These are:

Graph name	Vertex count	Diameter	Girth	Intersection array
Tetrahedral graph or complete graph K_{4}	4	1	3	{3;1}
complete bipartite graph K_{3,3}	6	2	4	{3,2;1,3}
Petersen graph	10	2	5	{3,2;1,1}
Cubical graph	8	3	4	{3,2,1;1,2,3}
Heawood graph	14	3	6	{3,2,2;1,1,3}
Pappus graph	18	4	6	{3,2,2,1;1,1,2,3}
Coxeter graph	28	4	7	{3,2,2,1;1,1,1,2}
Tutte–Coxeter graph	30	4	8	{3,2,2,2;1,1,1,3}
Dodecahedral graph	20	5	5	{3,2,1,1,1;1,1,1,2,3}
Desargues graph	20	5	6	{3,2,2,1,1;1,1,2,2,3}
Biggs-Smith graph	102	7	9	{3,2,2,2,1,1,1;1,1,1,1,1,1,3}
Foster graph	90	8	10	{3,2,2,2,2,1,1,1;1,1,1,1,2,2,2,3}

== Relation to distance-regular graphs ==
Every distance-transitive graph is distance-regular, but the converse is not necessarily true.

In 1969, before publication of the Biggs–Smith definition, a Russian group led by Georgy Adelson-Velsky showed that there exist graphs that are distance-regular but not distance-transitive. The smallest distance-regular graph that is not distance-transitive is the Shrikhande graph, with 16 vertices and degree 6. The only graph of this type with degree three is the 126-vertex Tutte 12-cage. Complete lists of distance-transitive graphs are known for some degrees larger than three, but the classification of distance-transitive graphs with arbitrarily large vertex degree remains open.
