= Vertex-transitive graph =

Graph where all pairs of vertices are automorphic

Graph families defined by their automorphisms
distance-transitive	→	distance-regular	←	strongly regular
- ↓
symmetric (arc-transitive)	←	t-transitive, t ≥ 2		skew-symmetric
- ↓
_{(if connected)} vertex- and edge-transitive	→	edge-transitive and regular	→	edge-transitive
↓		↓		↓
vertex-transitive	→	regular	→	_{(if bipartite)} biregular
- ↑
Cayley graph	←	zero-symmetric		asymmetric

In the mathematical field of graph theory, an automorphism is a permutation of the vertices such that edges are mapped to edges and non-edges are mapped to non-edges. A graph is a vertex-transitive graph if, given any two vertices v_{1} and v_{2} of G, there is an automorphism f such that

$$f(v_1) = v_2.\$$

In other words, a graph is vertex-transitive if its automorphism group acts transitively on its vertices. A graph is vertex-transitive if and only if its graph complement is, since the group actions are identical.

Every vertex-transitive graph is regular. However, not all regular graphs are vertex-transitive (for example, the Frucht graph and Tietze's graph). A symmetric graph is one that is both vertex-transitive and edge-transitive; it follows that while every symmetric graph is vertex-transitive, not all vertex-transitive graphs are symmetric (for example, the edges of the truncated tetrahedron).

== Finite examples ==
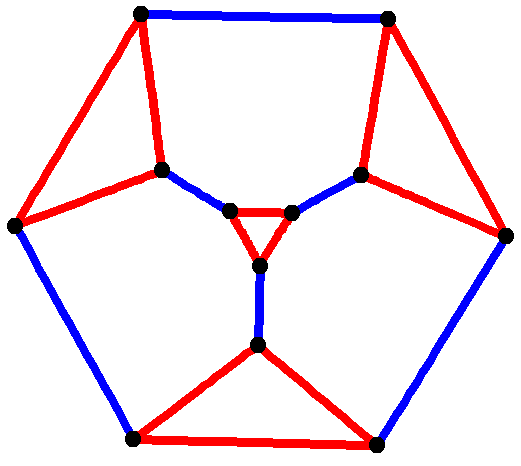
The edges of the truncated tetrahedron form a vertex-transitive graph (also a Cayley graph) which is not symmetric.

Finite vertex-transitive graphs include the symmetric graphs (such as the Petersen graph, the Heawood graph and the vertices and edges of the Platonic solids). The finite Cayley graphs (such as cube-connected cycles) are also vertex-transitive, as are the vertices and edges of the Archimedean solids (though only two of these are symmetric). Potočnik, Spiga and Verret have constructed a census of all connected cubic vertex-transitive graphs on at most 1280 vertices.

Although every Cayley graph is vertex-transitive, there exist other vertex-transitive graphs that are not Cayley graphs. The most famous example is the Petersen graph, but others can be constructed including the line graphs of edge-transitive non-bipartite graphs with odd vertex degrees.

== Properties ==
Every vertex-transitive graph is regular. The edge-connectivity of a connected vertex-transitive graph is equal to the degree d, while the vertex-connectivity will be at least 2(d + 1)/3. If the degree is 4 or less, or the graph is also edge-transitive, or the graph is a minimal Cayley graph, then the vertex-connectivity will also be equal to d.

== Infinite examples ==
Infinite vertex-transitive graphs include:

- infinite paths (infinite in both directions)
- infinite regular trees, e.g. the Cayley graph of the free group
- graphs of uniform tessellations (see a complete list of planar tessellations), including all tilings by regular polygons
- infinite Cayley graphs
- the Rado graph

Two countable vertex-transitive graphs are called quasi-isometric if the ratio of their distance functions is bounded from below and from above. A well known conjecture stated that every infinite vertex-transitive graph is quasi-isometric to a Cayley graph. A counterexample was proposed by Diestel and Leader in 2001. In 2005, Eskin, Fisher, and Whyte confirmed the counterexample.

== See also ==
- Edge-transitive graph
- Lovász conjecture
- Semi-symmetric graph
- Zero-symmetric graph
