= Edge-transitive graph =

Graph where all pairs of edges are automorphic

Graph families defined by their automorphisms
distance-transitive	→	distance-regular	←	strongly regular
- ↓
symmetric (arc-transitive)	←	t-transitive, t ≥ 2		skew-symmetric
- ↓
_{(if connected)} vertex- and edge-transitive	→	edge-transitive and regular	→	edge-transitive
↓		↓		↓
vertex-transitive	→	regular	→	_{(if bipartite)} biregular
- ↑
Cayley graph	←	zero-symmetric		asymmetric

In the mathematical field of graph theory, an edge-transitive graph is a graph G such that, given any two edges e_{1} and e_{2} of G, there is an automorphism of G that maps e_{1} to e_{2}.

In other words, a graph is edge-transitive if its automorphism group acts transitively on its edges.

== Examples and properties ==
The Gray graph is edge-transitive and regular, but not vertex-transitive.

The number of connected simple edge-transitive graphs on n vertices is 1, 1, 2, 3, 4, 6, 5, 8, 9, 13, 7, 19, 10, 16, 25, 26, 12, 28 ... (sequence A095424 in the OEIS)

Edge-transitive graphs include all symmetric graphs, such as the vertices and edges of the cube. Symmetric graphs are also vertex-transitive (if they are connected), but in general edge-transitive graphs need not be vertex-transitive. Every connected edge-transitive graph that is not vertex-transitive must be bipartite, (and hence can be colored with only two colors), and either semi-symmetric or biregular.

Examples of edge but not vertex transitive graphs include the complete bipartite graphs $K_{m,n}$ where m ≠ n, which includes the star graphs $K_{1,n}$. For graphs on n vertices, there are (n-1)/2 such graphs for odd n and (n-2) for even n. Additional edge transitive graphs which are not symmetric can be formed as subgraphs of these complete bi-partite graphs in certain cases. Subgraphs of complete bipartite graphs K_{m,n} exist when m and n share a factor greater than 2. When the greatest common factor is 2, subgraphs exist when 2n/m is even or if m=4 and n is an odd multiple of 6. So edge transitive subgraphs exist for K_{3,6}, K_{4,6} and K_{5,10} but not K_{4,10}. An alternative construction for some edge transitive graphs is to add vertices to the midpoints of edges of a symmetric graph with v vertices and e edges, creating a bipartite graph with e vertices of order 2, and v of order 2e/v.

An edge-transitive graph that is also regular, but still not vertex-transitive, is called semi-symmetric. The Gray graph, a cubic graph on 54 vertices, is an example of a regular graph which is edge-transitive but not vertex-transitive. The Folkman graph, a quartic graph on 20 vertices is the smallest such graph.

The vertex connectivity of an edge-transitive graph always equals its minimum degree.

== See also ==
- Edge-transitive (in geometry)
