= Regular graph =

Graph where each vertex has the same number of neighbors

Graph families defined by their automorphisms
| distance-transitive | → | distance-regular | ← | strongly regular |
- ↓
| symmetric (arc-transitive) | ← | t-transitive, t ≥ 2 | | skew-symmetric |
- ↓
| _{(if connected)} vertex- and edge-transitive | → | edge-transitive and regular | → | edge-transitive |
| ↓ | | ↓ | | ↓ |
| vertex-transitive | → | regular | → | _{(if bipartite)} biregular |
- ↑
| Cayley graph | ← | zero-symmetric | | asymmetric |

In graph theory, a regular graph is a graph where each vertex has the same number of neighbors; i.e. every vertex has the same degree or valency. A regular directed graph must also satisfy the stronger condition that the indegree and outdegree of each internal vertex are equal to each other. A regular graph with vertices of degree k is called a k‑regular graph or regular graph of degree k.

== Special cases ==
Regular graphs of degree at most 2 are easy to classify: a 0-regular graph consists of disconnected vertices, a 1-regular graph consists of disconnected edges, and a 2-regular graph consists of a disjoint union of cycles and infinite chains.

In analogy with the terminology for polynomials of low degrees, a 3-regular or 4-regular graph often is called a cubic graph or a quartic graph, respectively. Similarly, it is possible to denote k-regular graphs with $k=5,6,7,8,\ldots$ as quintic, sextic, septic, octic, et cetera.

A strongly regular graph is a regular graph where every adjacent pair of vertices has the same number l of neighbors in common, and every non-adjacent pair of vertices has the same number n of neighbors in common. The smallest graphs that are regular but not strongly regular are the cycle graph and the circulant graph on 6 vertices.

The complete graph K_{m} is strongly regular for any m.

0-regular graph

1-regular graph

2-regular graph

3-regular graph

== Properties ==
By the degree sum formula, a k-regular graph with n vertices has $\frac{nk}2$ edges. In particular, at least one of the order n and the degree k must be an even number.

A theorem by Nash-Williams says that every k‑regular graph on 2k + 1 vertices has a Hamiltonian cycle.

Let A be the adjacency matrix of a graph. Then the graph is regular if and only if $\textbf{j}=(1, \dots ,1)$ is an eigenvector of A. Its eigenvalue will be the constant degree of the graph. Eigenvectors corresponding to other eigenvalues are orthogonal to $\textbf{j}$, so for such eigenvectors $v=(v_1,\dots,v_n)$, we have $\sum_{i=1}^n v_i = 0$.

A regular graph of degree k is connected if and only if the eigenvalue k has multiplicity one. The "only if" direction is a consequence of the Perron–Frobenius theorem.

There is also a criterion for regular and connected graphs : a graph is connected and regular if and only if the matrix of ones J, with $J_{ij}=1$, is in the adjacency algebra of the graph (meaning it is a linear combination of powers of A).

Let G be a k-regular graph with diameter D and eigenvalues of adjacency matrix $k=\lambda_0 >\lambda_1\geq \cdots\geq\lambda_{n-1}$. If G is not bipartite, then

$D\leq \frac{\log{(n-1)}}{\log(\lambda_0/\lambda_1)}+1.$

== Existence ==
There exists a $k$-regular graph of order $n$ if and only if the natural numbers n and k satisfy the inequality $n \geq k+1$ and that $nk$ is even.

Proof: If a graph with n vertices is k-regular, then the degree k of any vertex v cannot exceed the number $n-1$ of vertices different from v, and indeed at least one of n and k must be even, whence so is their product.

Conversely, if n and k are two natural numbers satisfying both the inequality and the parity condition, then indeed there is a k-regular circulant graph $C_n^{s_1,\ldots,s_r}$ of order n (where the $s_i$ denote the minimal `jumps' such that vertices with indices differing by an $s_i$ are adjacent). If in addition k is even, then $k = 2r$, and a possible choice is $(s_1,\ldots,s_r) = (1,2,\ldots,r)$. Else k is odd, whence n must be even, say with $n = 2m$, and then $k = 2r-1$ and the `jumps' may be chosen as $(s_1,\ldots,s_r) = (1,2,\ldots,r-1,m)$.

If $n=k+1$, then this circulant graph is complete.

== Generation ==
Fast algorithms exist to generate, up to isomorphism, all regular graphs with a given degree and number of vertices.

== See also ==
- Random regular graph
- Strongly regular graph
- Moore graph
- Cage graph
- Highly irregular graph
