= Goldner–Harary graph =

Undirected graph with 11 nodes and 27 edges

- Named after: A. Goldner, Frank Harary
- Vertices: 11
- Edges: 27
- Radius: 2
- Diameter: 2
- Girth: 3
- Automorphisms: 12 (D_{6})
- Chromatic number: 4
- Chromatic index: 8
- Properties: Polyhedral; Planar; Chordal; Perfect; Treewidth 3

In the mathematical field of graph theory, the Goldner–Harary graph is a simple undirected graph with 11 vertices and 27 edges. It is named after Anita M. Goldner and Frank Harary, who proved in 1975 that it was the smallest non-Hamiltonian maximal planar graph. The same graph had already been given as an example of a non-Hamiltonian simplicial polyhedron by Branko Grünbaum in 1967.

== Properties ==
The Goldner–Harary graph is a planar graph: it can be drawn in the plane with none of its edges crossing. When drawn on a plane, all its faces are triangular, making it a maximal planar graph. As with every maximal planar graph, it is also 3-vertex-connected: the removal of any two of its vertices leaves a connected subgraph.

The Goldner–Harary graph is non-Hamiltonian, meaning there cannot exist a cycle passing once through each of the eleven vertices. The smallest possible number of vertices for a non-Hamiltonian polyhedral graph is 11. Therefore, the Goldner–Harary graph is a minimal example of this type. However, the Herschel graph, another non-Hamiltonian polyhedron with 11 vertices, has fewer edges.

The Goldner–Harary is 3-tree, constructed from a complete graph on two vertices, repeatedly adding vertices until the graph has exactly three neighbors, which forms a clique. Like any $k$-tree, it has treewidth 3, and its graph is maximal, meaning it can add no more edges without increasing its treewidth. Both of its maximal cliques and clique separators have the same size, hence the graph is chordal. As a planar 3-tree, it forms an example of an Apollonian network.

An arc diagram of the Goldner–Harary graph. This graph has no Hamiltonian cycle, but can be made Hamiltonian by subdividing the edge crossed by the red dashed line segment and adding two edges along this segment.

As a non-Hamiltonian maximal planar graph, the Goldner–Harary graph provides an example of a planar graph with book thickness greater than two. Equivalently, it does not have a planar arc diagram with all vertices on a line and all edges drawn as curves that stay on a single side of the line. Based on the existence of such examples, Bernhart and Kainen conjectured that the book thickness of planar graphs could be made arbitrarily large. Nonetheless, it was subsequently shown that all planar graphs have book thickness at most four.

It has book thickness 3, chromatic number 4, chromatic index 8, girth 3, radius 2, diameter 2 and is a 3-edge-connected graph.

The automorphism group of the Goldner–Harary graph is of order 12 and is isomorphic to the dihedral group D_{6}, the group of symmetries of a regular hexagon, including both rotations and reflections.

The characteristic polynomial of the Goldner–Harary graph is : $-(x-1)^2 x^2 (x+2)^3 (x^2-3) (x^2-4 x-9)$.

== Polyhedron ==
Realization of the Goldner–Harary graph as a convex polyhedron.

By Steinitz's theorem, the Goldner–Harary graph is a polyhedral graph: it is 3-connected planar, so there exists a convex polyhedron having the Goldner–Harary graph as its skeleton. Geometrically, the Goldner–Harary graph represents a simplicial polyhedron, a polyhedron with triangular faces. The polyhedron is constructed by gluing tetrahedra onto each face of a triangular dipyramid, the Kleetope of the triangular dipyramid. If the tetrahedra are regular tetrahedron, meaning their faces are equilateral triangles and all edges are of equal length, the result is a non-convex deltahedron.

The dual graph of the Goldner–Harary graph is represented geometrically by the truncation of the triangular prism.
