= Universal point set =

Points usable to draw any planar graph

Unsolved problem in mathematics
Do planar graphs have universal point sets of subquadratic size?
More unsolved problems in mathematics

In graph drawing, a universal point set of order n is a set S of points in the Euclidean plane with the property that every n-vertex planar graph has a straight-line drawing in which the vertices are all placed at points of S.

== Bounds on the size of universal point sets ==
Grid drawing of a nested triangles graph. In any drawing of this graph, at least half of the triangles must form a nested chain, which requires a bounding box of size at least n/3 × n/3. The layout shown here comes close to this, using size approximately n/3 × n/2

When n ≤ 10, there exist universal point sets with exactly n points, but for all n ≥ 15 additional points are required.

Several authors have shown that subsets of the integer lattice of size O(n) × O(n) are universal. In particular, de Fraysseix, Pach & Pollack (1988) showed that a grid of (2n − 3) × (n − 1) points is universal, and Schnyder (1990) reduced this to a triangular subset of an (n − 1) × (n − 1) grid, with n^{2}/2 − O(n) points. By modifying the method of de Fraysseix et al., Brandenburg (2008) found an embedding of any planar graph into a triangular subset of the grid consisting of 4n^{2}/9 points. A universal point set in the form of a rectangular grid must have size at least n/3 × n/3 but this does not rule out the possibility of smaller universal point sets of other types. The smallest known universal point sets are not based on grids, but are instead constructed from superpatterns (permutations that contain all permutation patterns of a given size); the universal point sets constructed in this way have size n^{2}/4 − Θ(n).

de Fraysseix, Pach & Pollack (1988) proved the first nontrivial lower bound on the size of a universal point set, with a bound of the form n + Ω(√n), and Chrobak & Karloff (1989) showed that universal point sets must contain at least 1.098n − o(n) points. Kurowski (2004) stated an even stronger bound of 1.235n − o(n), which was further improved by Scheucher, Schrezenmaier & Steiner (2018) to 1.293n − o(n).

Closing the gap between the known linear lower bounds and quadratic upper bounds remains an open problem.

== Special classes of graphs ==
Subclasses of the planar graphs may, in general, have smaller universal sets (sets of points that allow straight-line drawings of all n-vertex graphs in the subclass) than the full class of planar graphs, and in many cases universal point sets of exactly n points are possible. For instance, it is not hard to see that every set of n points in convex position (forming the vertices of a convex polygon) is universal for the n-vertex outerplanar graphs, and in particular for trees. Less obviously, every set of n points in general position (no three collinear) remains universal for outerplanar graphs.

Planar graphs that can be partitioned into nested cycles, 2-outerplanar graphs and planar graphs of bounded pathwidth, have universal point sets of nearly-linear size. Planar 3-trees have universal point sets of size O(n^{3/2} log n); the same bound also applies to series–parallel graphs.

== Other drawing styles ==
An arc diagram

As well as for straight-line graph drawing, universal point sets have been studied for other drawing styles; in many of these cases, universal point sets with exactly n points exist, based on a topological book embedding in which the vertices are placed along a line in the plane and the edges are drawn as curves that cross this line at most once. For instance, every set of n collinear points is universal for an arc diagram in which each edge is represented as either a single semicircle or a smooth curve formed from two semicircles.

By using a similar layout, every strictly convex curve in the plane can be shown to contain an n-point subset that is universal for polyline drawing with at most one bend per edge. This set contains only the vertices of the drawing, not the bends; larger sets are known that can be used for polyline drawing with all vertices and all bends placed within the set.
