= Universal set (disambiguation) =

Universal set may refer to:

== Mathematics ==
- Universal set, the set of all objects, an object whose existence conflicts with the axioms of standard set theory but may exist in other variants
- Universe (mathematics), the proper class of all objects in a domain of discourse
- Universal point set, in graph drawing, a set that can be used for the vertices of drawings of all n-vertex planar graphs
- Sample space, in probability theory and statistics, the set of all possible outcomes of an observation or experiment

== Other ==
- Universal Character Set, a set of nearly 100,000 characters on which many character encodings are based
