= Regular tetrahedron =

Solid with four equal triangular faces

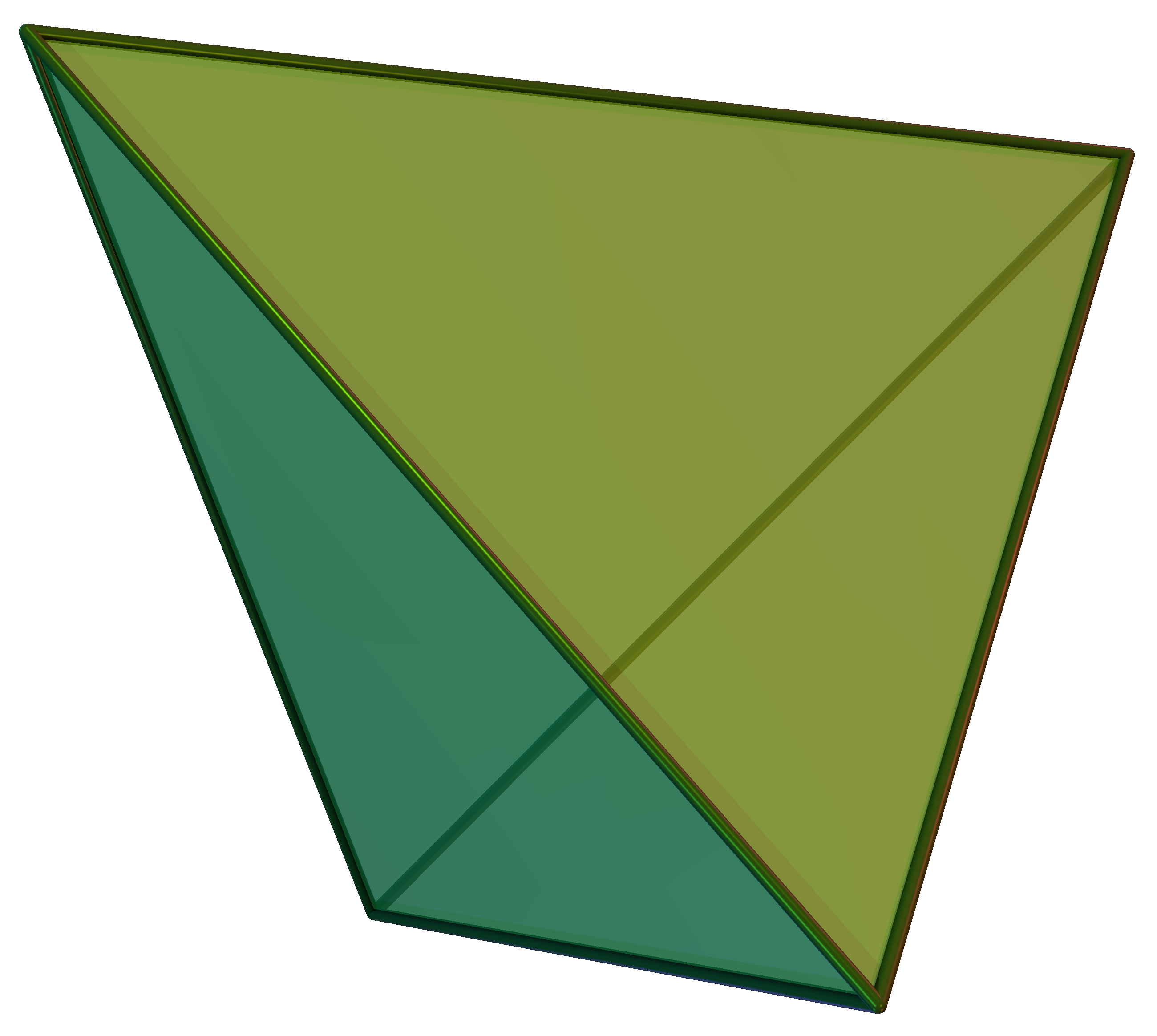
- Type: Deltahedron; Platonic solid Pyramid
- Faces: 4 equilateral triangles
- Edges: 6
- Vertices: 4
- Symmetry group: tetrahedral symmetry $\mathrm{T}_\mathrm{h}$
- Dual polyhedron: self-dual
- Properties: convex

Net

A regular tetrahedron is a polyhedron with four equilateral triangular faces.

== Description ==
=== Classifications ===
A regular tetrahedron is a tetrahedron (that is, a four-sided polyhedron) in which all four faces are equilateral triangles. In other words, all of its faces are the same size and shape (congruent), and all edges are the same length. As a convex polyhedron, the regular tetrahedron is the deltahedron with the smallest number of vertices and faces out of eight convex deltahedra. Being a deltahedron means that all faces of a polyhedron are equilateral triangles. Like the other pyramids and all tetrahedra in general, the regular tetrahedron is self-dual, meaning its dual is a regular tetrahedron itself.

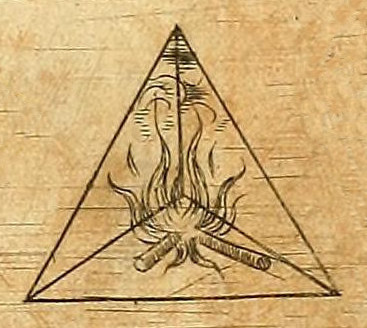
Regular tetrahedron, representing the classical element of fire, sketched by Johannes Kepler.

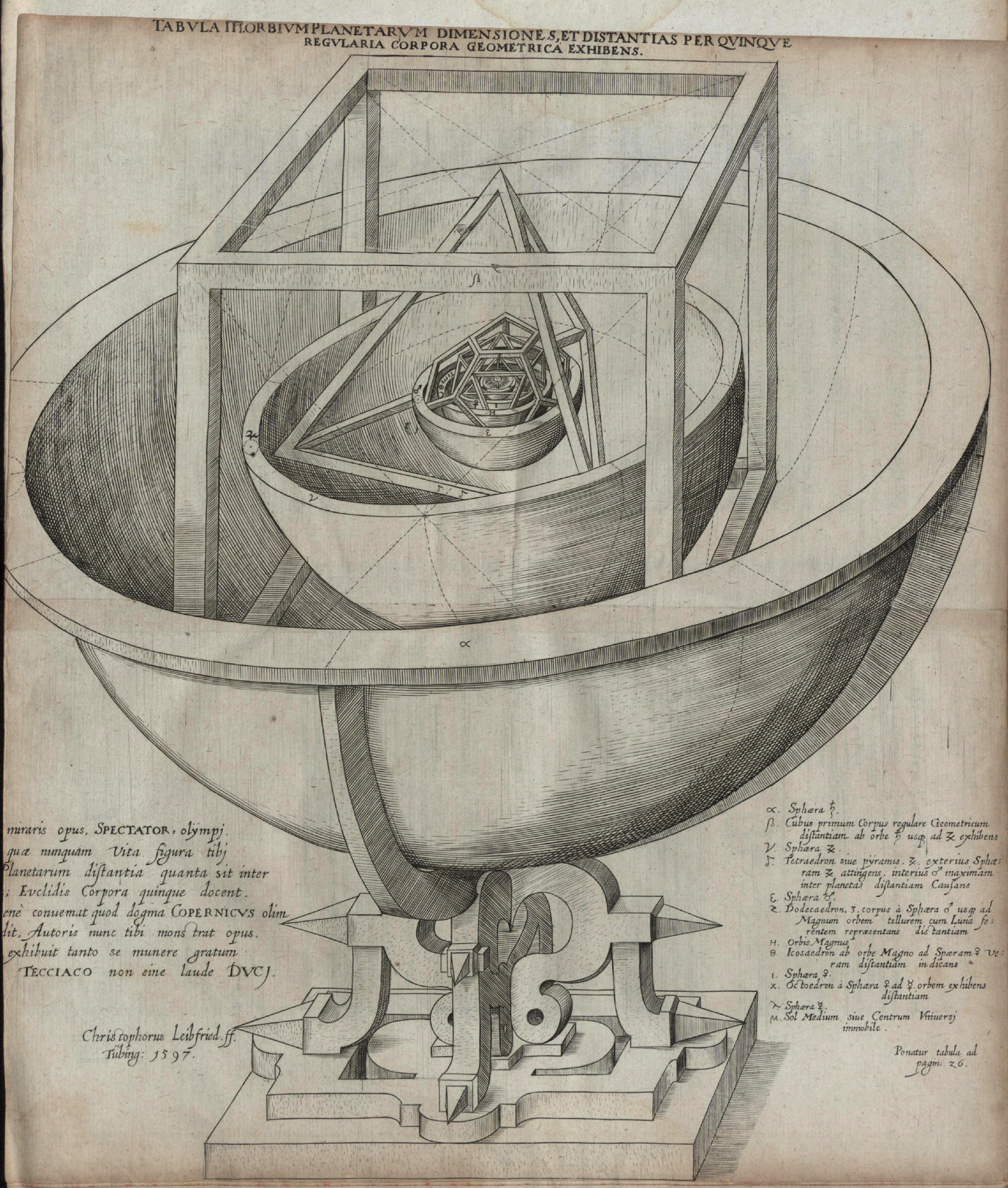
Kepler's Platonic solid model of the Solar System

The regular tetrahedron is also one of the five regular Platonic solids—polyhedra in which all of their faces are regular polygons. Known since antiquity, Platonic solids are named after the Greek philosopher Plato, who associated four of those solids with fundamental natural elements. He assigned the regular tetrahedron to the classical element of fire, because its corner is sharpest and most penetrating. Following its attribution with nature by Plato, Johannes Kepler in his Harmonices Mundi sketched each of the Platonic solids. In his Mysterium Cosmographicum, Kepler also proposed the Solar System by using the Platonic solids, setting one inside another and separating them with six spheres resembling the six planets. The ordered solids started from the innermost to the outermost: regular octahedron, regular icosahedron, regular dodecahedron, regular tetrahedron, and cube. Plato's student Aristotle incorrectly claimed that the regular tetrahedron can fill space, but the cube is the only Platonic solid with this property.

Regular tetrahedron is the degenerated antiprism.

=== Cartesian coordinates ===
One way to construct a regular tetrahedron is by using the following Cartesian coordinates, defining the four vertices of a tetrahedron with edge length 2, centered at the origin, and two-level edges:
$$\left(\pm 1, 0, -\frac{1}{\sqrt{2}}\right) \qquad \left(0, \pm 1, \frac{1}{\sqrt{2}}\right)$$

A regular tetrahedron can be embedded inside a cube in two ways such that each vertex is a vertex of the cube, and each edge is a diagonal of one of the cube's faces. For one such embedding, the Cartesian coordinates of the vertices are
$$\begin{align}
(1,1,1), &\quad (1,-1,-1), \\
(-1,1,-1), &\quad (-1,-1,1).
\end{align}$$
This yields a tetrahedron with edge-length $2 \sqrt{2}$, centered at the origin. For the other tetrahedron (which is dual to the first), reverse all the signs. These two tetrahedra's vertices combined are the vertices of a cube, demonstrating that the regular tetrahedron is the 3-demicube, a polyhedron that is by alternating a cube. This form has Coxeter diagram and Schläfli symbol $\mathrm{h}\{4,3\}$.

== Properties ==
=== Measurement ===
3D model of a regular tetrahedron

Let $a$ be the edge length of a regular tetrahedron. The height of an equilateral triangle, the segment line is drawn from any vertex to the midpoint of an edge, and by the calculation of Pythagorean theorem, the height of any equilateral triangle is $\frac{\sqrt{3}}{2}a$. The distance between the centroid and a vertex has two different lengths; the longest is two-thirds of the height of an equilateral triangle. By the Pythagorean theorem again, one can find the height of a regular tetrahedron:
$$h = \frac{\sqrt{6}}{3}a \approx 0.816a.$$
Since the shortest distance between the centroid and a vertex is one-third of the height of an equilateral triangle, the dihedral angle (i.e., an angle between two triangular faces) of a regular tetrahedron is $\arccos \left(1/3 \right) = \arctan\left(2\sqrt{2}\right) \approx 70.529^\circ$.

The surface area of a regular tetrahedron is four times area of an equilateral triangle:
$$A = 4 \cdot \left(\frac{\sqrt{3}}{4}a^2\right) = a^2 \sqrt{3} \approx 1.732a^2.$$

The volume is one-third of the base times the height, the general formula for a pyramid. This can also be found by dissecting a cube into a tetrahedron and four triangular pyramids.
$$V = \frac{1}{3} \cdot \left(\frac{\sqrt{3}}{4}a^2\right) \cdot \frac{\sqrt{6}}{3}a = \frac{a^3}{6\sqrt{2}} \approx 0.118a^3.$$

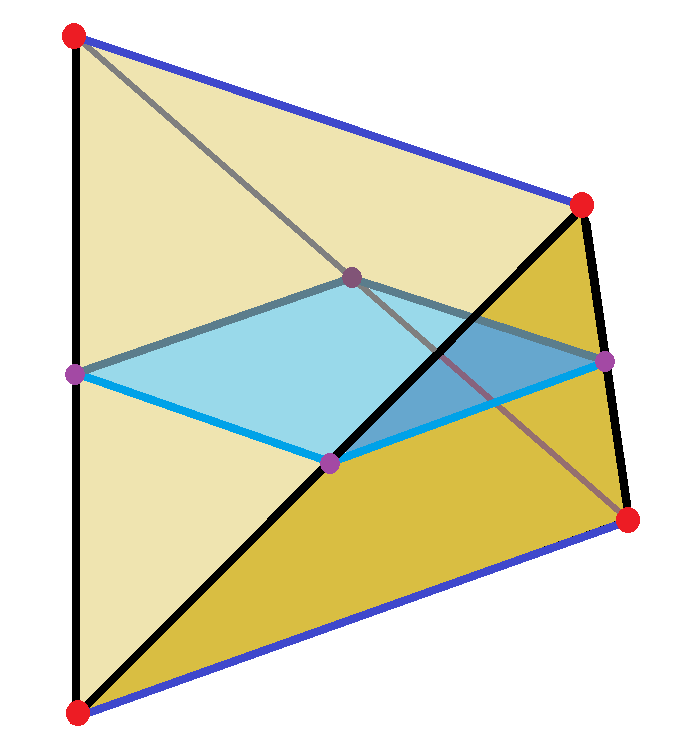
A central cross section of a regular tetrahedron is a square.

The radii of its circumsphere $r_\mathrm{ci}$ (a sphere that contains the regular tetrahedron and touches its vertices), insphere $r_\text{in}$ (a sphere within a regular tetrahedron and touches to its faces), midsphere $r_\mathrm{mi}$ (a sphere that touches its edges), and exsphere (a sphere outside, touches the face of a regular tetrahedron and the planes defined by extending the adjacent faces outwards) $r_\mathrm{ex}$ are:
$$\begin{align}
r_\mathrm{ci} = \frac{a\sqrt{3}}{2\sqrt{2}} \approx 0.612a, &\qquad r_\mathrm{in} = \frac{1}{3}r_\mathrm{ci} \approx 0.204a, \\
r_\mathrm{mi} = \sqrt{r_\mathrm{in} r_\mathrm{ci}} \approx 0.354a, &\qquad r_\mathrm{ex} = \frac{a}{\sqrt{6}} \approx 0.408a.
\end{align}$$
For a regular tetrahedron with side length $a$ and circumsphere radius $R$, the distances $d_i$ from an arbitrary point in 3-space to its four vertices satisfy the equations:
$$\begin{align}\frac{d_1^4 + d_2^4 + d_3^4 + d_4^4}{4} + \frac{16R^4}{9}&= \left(\frac{d_1^2 + d_2^2 + d_3^2 + d_4^2}{4} + \frac{2R^2}{3}\right)^2, \\
4\left(a^4 + d_1^4 + d_2^4 + d_3^4 + d_4^4\right) &= \left(a^2 + d_1^2 + d_2^2 + d_3^2 + d_4^2\right)^2.\end{align}$$

With respect to the base plane the slope of a face (2√2) is twice that of an edge (√2), corresponding to the fact that the horizontal distance covered from the base to the apex along an edge is twice that along the median of a face. In other words, if C is the centroid of the base, the distance from C to a vertex of the base is twice that from C to the midpoint of an edge of the base. This follows from the fact that the medians of a triangle intersect at its centroid, and this point divides each of them in two segments, one of which is twice as long as the other (see proof).

Its solid angle at a vertex subtended by a face is $\arccos\left(\frac{23}{27}\right) = \frac{\pi}{2} - 3\arcsin\left(\frac{1}{3}\right) = 3\arccos \left(\frac{1}{3}\right)-\pi,$ or approximately 0.55129 steradians or 1809.8 square degrees.

=== Symmetry ===
Illustration of the rotational axes (order-3 rotation on a vertex and face, and order-2 on two edges) and reflection planes (through two faces and one edge) in the symmetry group of the regular tetrahedron

The regular tetrahedron has a three-dimensional symmetry group known as full tetrahedral symmetry $\mathrm{T}_\mathrm{d}$ or as the symmetric group $S_4$. This symmetry group has 24 isometries, containing seven rotational axes and six reflectional planes. The seven rotational axes are the four axes of three-fold rotational symmetry (0°, 120°, and 240°) passing through a vertex to the centroid of an equilateral triangular face, and the three axes of two-fold rotational symmetry (0° and 180°) passing through the midpoint of two edges. This point group has rotational tetrahedral symmetry $\mathrm{T}$.

The vertices of a cube can be grouped into two groups of four, each forming a regular tetrahedron, showing one of the two tetrahedra in the cube. The symmetries of a regular tetrahedron correspond to half of those of a cube: those that map the tetrahedra to themselves, and not to each other. The tetrahedron is the only Platonic solid not mapped to itself by point inversion.

=== Spherical tetrahedron ===
Spherical tetrahedron

The tetrahedron can also be represented as a spherical tiling (of spherical triangles), and projected onto the plane via a stereographic projection. This projection is conformal, preserving angles but not areas or lengths. Straight lines on the sphere are projected as circular arcs on the plane.

The first few members in the infinite families of regular hosohedra and dihedra are geometrically simpler than the spherical tetrahedron, where the convex regular tetrahedron instead classifies as the simplest regular polyhedron of its class. For example, the hexagonal hosohedron or dihedron and the spherical tetrahedron are regular spherical polyhedra of equal order and total dimensional elements, though they are non-isomorphic (as they have distinct point group symmetries and associated fundamental domains).

=== Orthogonal projections ===
The regular tetrahedron has two special orthogonal projections, one centered on a vertex or equivalently on a face, and one centered on an edge. The first corresponds to the A_{2} Coxeter plane.

Centered by	Face/vertex	Edge
Image		
Projective symmetry	[3]	[4]

=== Projective spaces ===
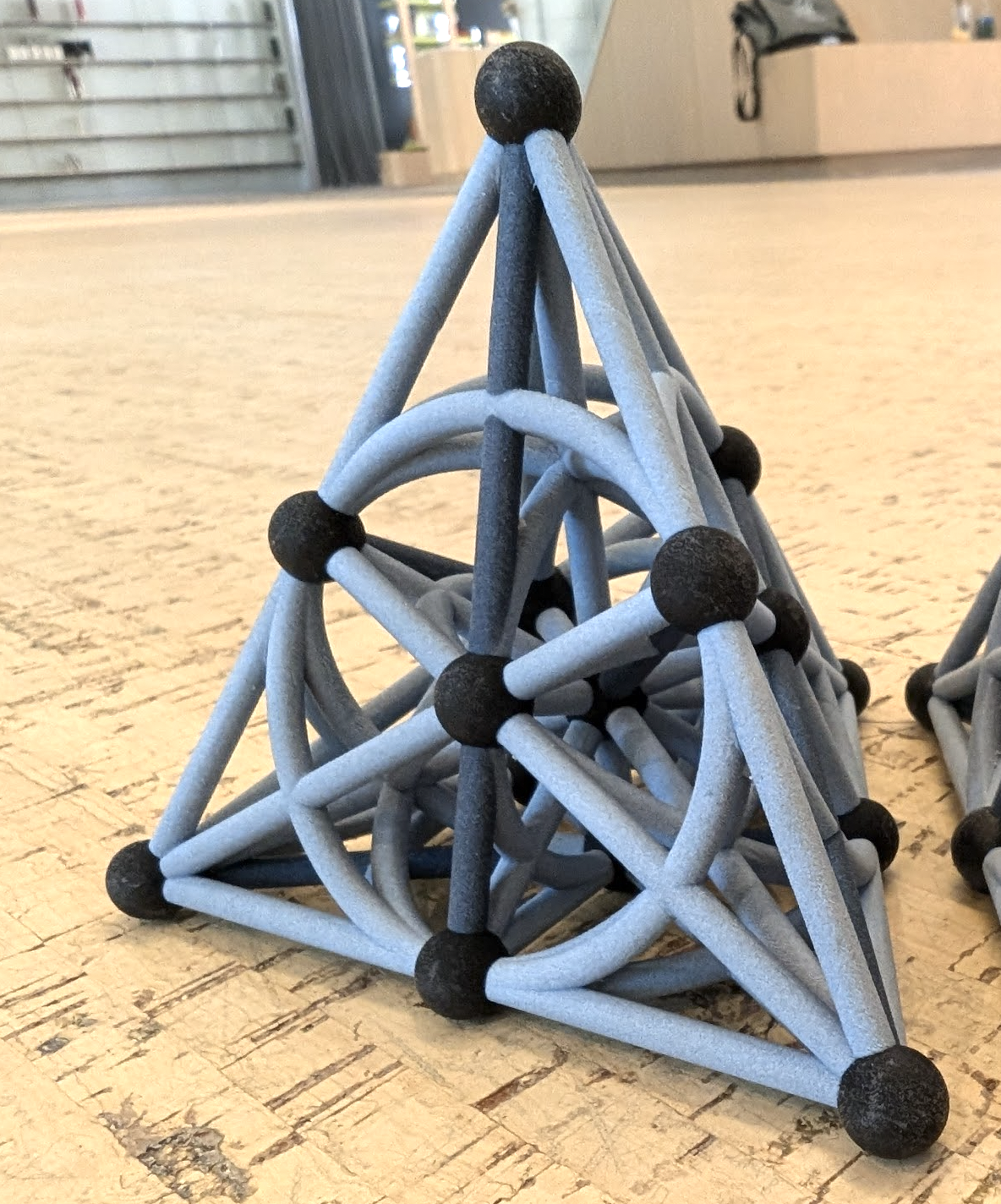
Extending the Fano plane in three dimension yields the smallest projective space, $\operatorname{PG}(3,2)$, which can be represented in a regular tetrahedron.

The smallest three-dimensional projective space $\operatorname{PG}(3,2)$ shares symmetry with the regular tetrahedron, when extending the two-dimensional Fano plane $\operatorname{PG}(2,2)$ in three dimensions. $\operatorname{PG}(3,2)$ has four points lying on the four vertices of a regular tetrahedron, six points on the midpoints of its six edges, four on the center (centroids) of its four faces, and a point at the interior core of the tetrahedron. Every single plane is isomorphic to a Fano plane as the smallest projective plane. In the geometry over the field with one element $\operatorname{F}_1$, vector spaces behave like finite sets, and projective subspaces correspond to ordinary subsets, therefore, $\operatorname{PG}(3,1)$ forms a standard 3-simplex, which is abstractly a regular tetrahedron. $\operatorname{PG}(3,2)$ serves as the three-dimensional projective realization of the sixteen-dimensional sedenions and their algebraic multiplication.

Subspaces of PG(3,2)
Dimensional element	$\operatorname{PG}(2,2)$ (Fano plane)	$\operatorname{PG}(3,1)$ (Regular tetrahedron)	$\operatorname{PG}(3,2)$
Points	7 points	4 points	15 points
Lines	6 lines	6 lines	35 lines
Planes	1 plane	4 faces	15 planes

== Related figures ==
=== Construction of polyhedra ===
Truncated tetrahedron and its dual, the triakis tetrahedron

Many polyhedra are constructed involving regular tetrahedra. By truncating the vertices of a regular tetrahedron, it becomes a truncated tetrahedron. The dual of this solid is the triakis tetrahedron, a regular tetrahedron with four triangular pyramids attached to each of its faces. i.e., its Kleetope. Some Johnson solid such as elongated triangular pyramid and elongated triangular bipyramid are constructed by attaching one and two regular tetrahedra onto the bases of a triangular prism; the triangular bipyramid is constructed by attaching two regular tetrahedra face-to-face.

Regular tetrahedra can be stacked face-to-face in a chiral aperiodic chain called the Boerdijk–Coxeter helix.

Compounds of tetrahedra
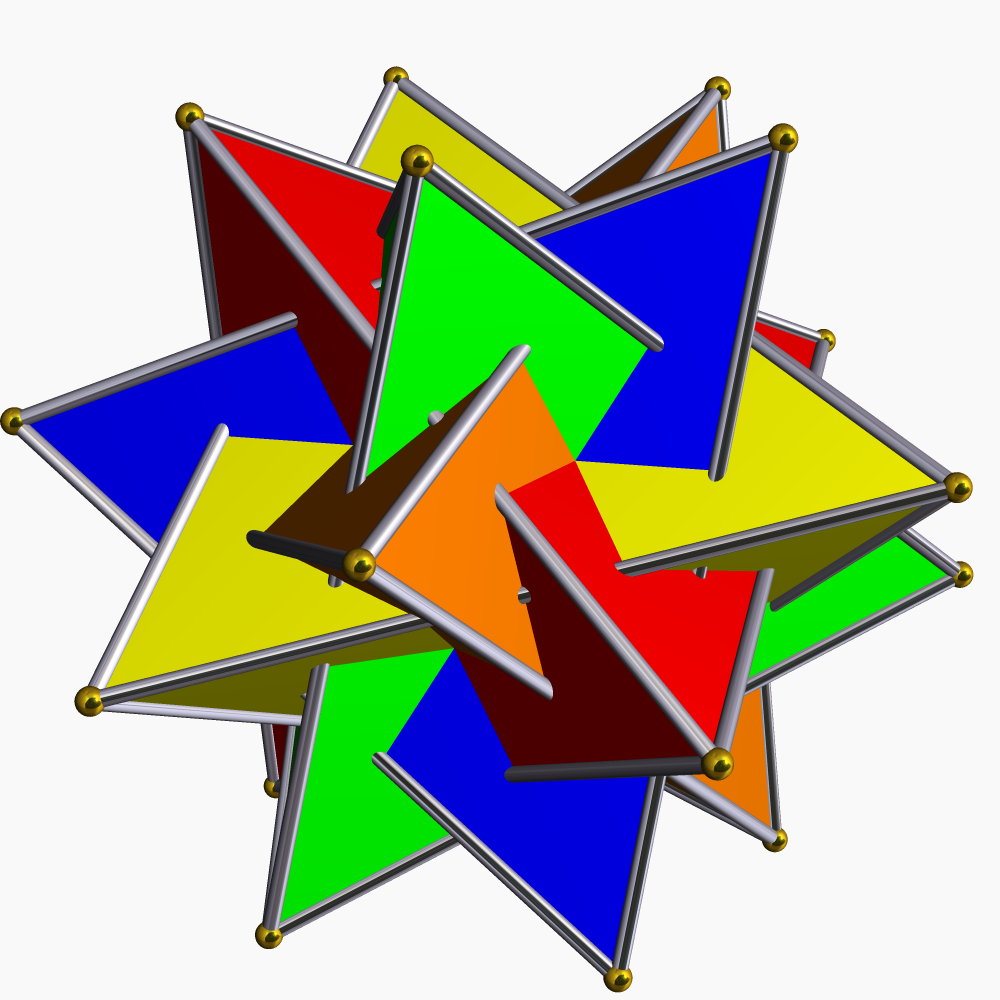
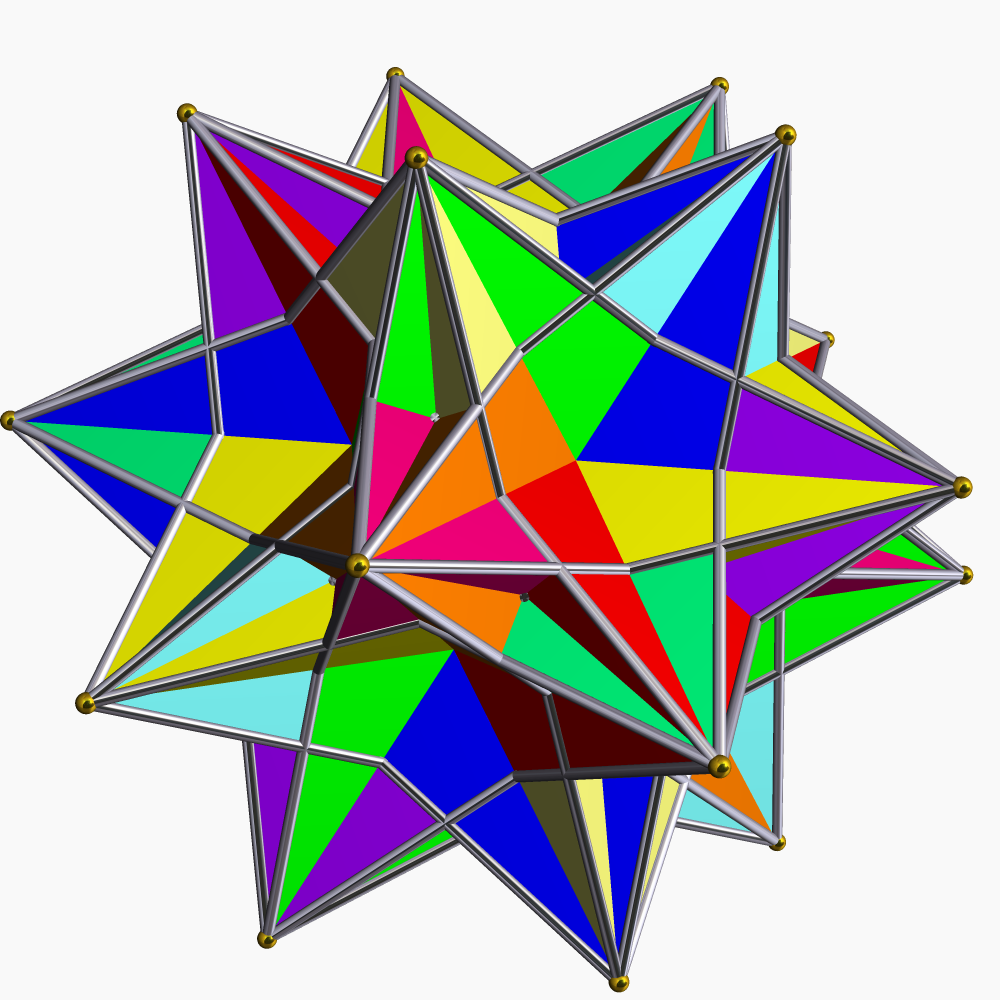
Left to right: compound of two tetrahedra, compound of five tetrahedra, compound of ten tetrahedra

The stellated octahedron is constructed by extending its faces to form equilateral triangles on each regular octahedron's face. In the perspective of polyhedral compounds, this figure comprises two such dual tetrahedra, a self-dual because of sharing a common intersphere in the center. Another interesting polyhedral compound involves five intersecting tetrahedra, which has been known for hundreds of years. It comes up regularly in the world of origami. Joining the twenty vertices would form a regular dodecahedron. There are both left-handed and right-handed forms, which are mirror images of each other. Superimposing both forms gives a compound of ten tetrahedra, in which the ten tetrahedra are arranged as five pairs of stellae octangulae.

=== Dehn invariant and honeycombs ===
The Dehn invariant of a regular tetrahedron can be defined as a tensor product of the edge length and the dihedral angle of a regular tetrahedron $6a \otimes \arccos \frac{1}{3}$, which is non-zero, where $a$ is the edge length of a regular tetrahedron. The Dehn invariant was originally dated from Hilbert's third problem, a set of 23 problems by David Hilbert, asking whether, given any two polyhedra with the same volume, the first polyhedron may be dissected into pieces, which then reassembled into the second polyhedron. His student, Max Dehn, provided the negative answer by showing his invariant.

Every polyhedron with a Dehn invariant of zero can tile a space with its copy by attaching its faces to another, forming a honeycomb. Since the regular tetrahedron has a non-zero Dehn invariant, it cannot alone do such. A related result that two different polyhedra that join to tile the space can have the Dehn invariant of zero. In the case of a regular tetrahedron, it can be alternated with regular octahedra in the ratio of two tetrahedra to one octahedron, forming the alternated cubic honeycomb.

=== Four-dimensional figures ===
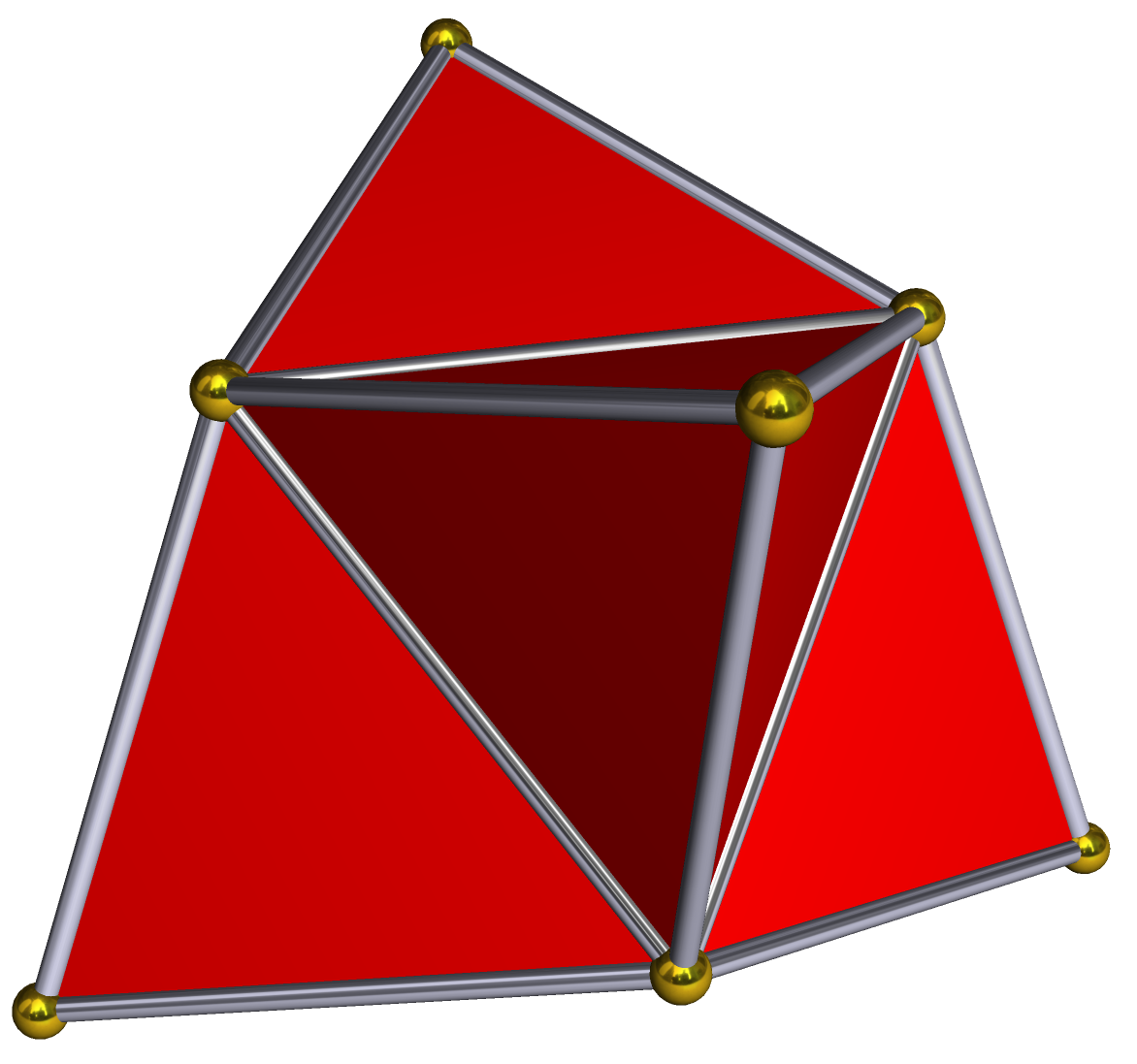
A stacked polytope of five regular tetrahedron (one remains hidden) and the 5-cell convex 4-polytope which is a 4-dimensional simplex (generalization of a tetrahedron to 4d)

The pentachoron is a four-dimensional polytope, a generalization of a tetrahedron in four-dimensional space. It is bounded by five regular tetrahedra, known as cells.

In four dimensions, all the convex regular 4-polytopes with tetrahedral cells (the 5-cell, 16-cell and 600-cell) can be constructed as tilings of the 3-sphere by these chains, which become periodic in the three-dimensional space of the 4-polytope's boundary surface.

== Characteristic orthoscheme ==
Every regular polytope, including the regular tetrahedron, has its characteristic orthoscheme. There is a 3-orthoscheme, which is the "characteristic tetrahedron of the regular tetrahedron". The regular tetrahedron is subdivided into 24 instances of its characteristic tetrahedron by its planes of symmetry. The 24 characteristic tetrahedra of the regular tetrahedron occur in two mirror-image forms, 12 of each.

Characteristics of the regular tetrahedron
	edge	arc		dihedral	
𝒍	$2$	109°28′16″	$\pi - 2\kappa$	70°31′44″	$\pi - 2\psi$
𝟀	$\sqrt{\tfrac{4}{3}} \approx 1.155$	70°31′44″	$2\kappa$	60°	$\tfrac{\pi}{3}$
𝝉 (Note: (Coxeter 1973) uses the greek letter 𝝓 (phi) to represent one of the three characteristic angles 𝟀, 𝝓, 𝟁 of a regular polytope. Because 𝝓 is commonly used to represent the golden ratio constant ≈ 1.618, for which Coxeter uses 𝝉 (tau), we reverse Coxeter's conventions, and use 𝝉 to represent the characteristic angle.)	$1$	54°44′8″	$\tfrac{\pi}{2} - \kappa$	60°	$\tfrac{\pi}{3}$
𝟁	$\sqrt{\tfrac{1}{3}} \approx 0.577$	54°44′8″	$\tfrac{\pi}{2} - \kappa$	60°	$\tfrac{\pi}{3}$
$_0R/l$	$\sqrt{\tfrac{3}{2}} \approx 1.225$				
$_1R/l$	$\sqrt{\tfrac{1}{2}} \approx 0.707$				
$_2R/l$	$\sqrt{\tfrac{1}{6}} \approx 0.408$				
$\kappa$		35°15′52″	$\tfrac{\text{arc sec }3}{2}$		

If the regular tetrahedron has edge length 𝒍 = 2, its characteristic tetrahedron's six edges have lengths $\sqrt{\tfrac{4}{3}}$, $1$, $\sqrt{\tfrac{1}{3}}$ around its exterior right-triangle face (the edges opposite the characteristic angles 𝟀, 𝝉, 𝟁), plus $\sqrt{\tfrac{3}{2}}$, $\sqrt{\tfrac{1}{2}}$, $\sqrt{\tfrac{1}{6}}$ (edges that are the characteristic radii of the regular tetrahedron). The 3-edge path along orthogonal edges of the orthoscheme is $1$, $\sqrt{\tfrac{1}{3}}$, $\sqrt{\tfrac{1}{6}}$, first from a tetrahedron vertex to an tetrahedron edge center, then turning 90° to an tetrahedron face center, then turning 90° to the tetrahedron center. The orthoscheme has four dissimilar right triangle faces. The exterior face is a 60-90-30 triangle which is one-sixth of a tetrahedron face. The three faces interior to the tetrahedron are: a right triangle with edges $1$, $\sqrt{\tfrac{3}{2}}$, $\sqrt{\tfrac{1}{2}}$, a right triangle with edges $\sqrt{\tfrac{1}{3}}$, $\sqrt{\tfrac{1}{2}}$, $\sqrt{\tfrac{1}{6}}$, and a right triangle with edges $\sqrt{\tfrac{4}{3}}$, $\sqrt{\tfrac{3}{2}}$, $\sqrt{\tfrac{1}{6}}$.
