= Uniquely colorable graph =

Graph with only one possible coloring

In graph theory, a uniquely colorable graph is a k-chromatic graph that has only one possible (proper) k-coloring up to permutation of the colors. Equivalently, there is only one way to partition its vertices into k independent sets and there is no way to partition them into k − 1 independent sets.

== Examples ==
A complete graph is uniquely colorable, because the only proper coloring is one that assigns each vertex a different color.

Every k-tree is uniquely (k + 1)-colorable. The uniquely 4-colorable planar graphs are known to be exactly the Apollonian networks, that is, the planar 3-trees.

Every connected bipartite graph is uniquely 2-colorable. Its 2-coloring can be obtained by choosing a starting vertex arbitrarily, coloring the vertices at even distance from the starting vertex with one color, and coloring the vertices at odd distance from the starting vertex with the other color.

== Properties ==
A uniquely k-colorable graph G with n vertices has at least m ≥ (k−1)n − k(k−1)/2 edges. Equality holds when G is a (k−1)-tree.

== Related concepts ==
=== Minimal imperfection ===
A minimal imperfect graph is a graph in which every subgraph is perfect. The deletion of any vertex from a minimal imperfect graph leaves a uniquely colorable subgraph.

=== Unique edge colorability ===
The unique 3-edge-coloring of the generalized Petersen graph G(9,2)

A uniquely edge-colorable graph is a k-edge-chromatic graph that has only one possible (proper) k-edge-coloring up to permutation of the colors. The only uniquely 2-edge-colorable graphs are the paths and the cycles. For any k, the stars K_{1,k} are uniquely k-edge-colorable. Moreover, Wilson (1976) conjectured and Thomason (1978) proved that, when k ≥ 4, they are also the only members in this family. However, there exist uniquely 3-edge-colorable graphs that do not fit into this classification, such as the graph of the triangular pyramid.

If a cubic graph is uniquely 3-edge-colorable, it must have exactly three Hamiltonian cycles, formed by the edges with two of its three colors, but some cubic graphs with only three Hamiltonian cycles are not uniquely 3-edge-colorable. Every simple planar cubic graph that is uniquely 3-edge-colorable contains a triangle, but W. T. Tutte (1976) observed that the generalized Petersen graph G(9,2) is non-planar, triangle-free, and uniquely 3-edge-colorable. For many years it was the only known such graph, and it had been conjectured to be the only such graph but now infinitely many triangle-free non-planar cubic uniquely 3-edge-colorable graphs are known.

=== Unique total colorability ===
A uniquely total colorable graph is a k-total-chromatic graph that has only one possible (proper) k-total-coloring up to permutation of the colors.

Empty graphs, paths, and cycles of length divisible by 3 are uniquely total colorable graphs. Mahmoodian & Shokrollahi (1995) conjectured that they are also the only members in this family.

Some properties of a uniquely k-total-colorable graph G with n vertices:

1. χ″(G) = Δ(G) + 1 unless G = K_{2}.
2. Δ(G) ≤ 2 δ(G).
3. Δ(G) ≤ n/2 + 1.

Here χ″(G) is the total chromatic number; Δ(G) is the maximum degree; and δ(G) is the minimum degree.
