= Partial k-tree =

Type of mathematical graph

In graph theory, a partial k-tree is a type of graph, defined either as a subgraph of a k-tree or as a graph with treewidth at most k. Many NP-hard combinatorial problems on graphs are solvable in polynomial time when restricted to the partial k-trees, for bounded values of k.

== Graph minors ==
Forbidden minors for partial 3-trees

For any fixed constant k, the partial k-trees are closed under the operation of graph minors, and therefore, by the Robertson–Seymour theorem, this family can be characterized in terms of a finite set of forbidden minors. The partial 1-trees are exactly the forests, and their single forbidden minor is a triangle. For the partial 2-trees the single forbidden minor is the complete graph on four vertices. However, the number of forbidden minors increases for larger values of k. For partial 3-trees there are four forbidden minors: the complete graph on five vertices, the octahedral graph with six vertices, the eight-vertex Wagner graph, and the pentagonal prism with ten vertices.

== Dynamic programming ==
Many algorithmic problems that are NP-complete for arbitrary graphs may be solved efficiently for partial k-trees by dynamic programming, using the tree decompositions of these graphs.

== Related families of graphs ==
If a family of graphs has bounded treewidth, then it is a subfamily of the partial k-trees, where k is the bound on the treewidth. Families of graphs with this property include the cactus graphs, pseudoforests, series–parallel graphs, outerplanar graphs, Halin graphs, and Apollonian networks. For instance, the series–parallel graphs are a subfamily of the partial 2-trees, and more strongly a graph is a partial 2-tree if and only if each of its biconnected components is series–parallel.

The control-flow graphs arising in the compilation of structured programs also have bounded treewidth, which allows certain tasks such as register allocation to be performed efficiently on them.
