= Paul Chester Kainen =

American mathematician

Paul Chester Kainen is an American mathematician, an adjunct associate professor of mathematics, and the director of the Lab for Visual Mathematics at Georgetown University. Kainen is the coauthor of a popular book on the four color theorem and is also known for his work on book embeddings of graphs.

== Biography ==
Kainen received his Bachelor of Arts degree from George Washington University in 1966 and was awarded the Ruggles Prize for Excellence in Mathematics. He went on to get his Ph.D. from Cornell University in 1970 with Peter Hilton as his thesis advisor. Kainen's father was the American artist Jacob Kainen.

== Selected publications ==
- Saaty, Thomas L.; Kainen, Paul C. (1977), The Four-Color Problem: Assaults and Conquest, New York: McGraw-Hill International Book Co., p. ix+217, MR 0480047. 2nd ed., Dover, 1986, ISBN 0-486-65092-8, MR 0863420.
- Bernhart, Frank R.; Kainen, Paul C. (1979), "The book thickness of a graph", Journal of Combinatorial Theory, Series B, 27 (3): 320–331, doi:10.1016/0095-8956(79)90021-2.
