= More or Less =

More or Less may refer to:

- More or Less (radio programme), a UK programme focusing on numbers and statistics
- More or Less (puzzle), an alternate name for the logic puzzle Futoshiki
- More or Less (pricing game), a pricing game on the game show The Price Is Right
- More or Less (album), a 2018 album by Dan Mangan
- "More or Less", a song by Screaming Trees from Sweet Oblivion
- "More or Less", a song by Talib Kweli from Eardrum
- More or Les, stage name for Leslie Seaforth, a Canadian rapper, DJ and producer

== See also ==
- Approximation
