= Queen's graph =

Mathematical graph relating to chess

Position: d8 white circle, h8 white circle, a7 white circle, d7 white circle, g7 white circle, b6 white circle, d6 white circle, f6 white circle, c5 white circle, d5 white circle, e5 white circle, a4 white circle, b4 white circle, c4 white circle, d4 white queen, e4 white circle, f4 white circle, g4 white circle, h4 white circle, c3 white circle, d3 white circle, e3 white circle, b2 white circle, d2 white circle, f2 white circle, a1 white circle, d1 white circle, g1 white circle
In an $8\times 8$ queen's graph, each square of the chessboard above is a vertex. There is an edge between any two vertices that a queen could move between; as an example, the vertices adjacent to d4 are marked with a white dot (i.e. there is an edge from d4 to each marked vertex).
- Vertices: $mn$
- Chromatic number: n if $m=n\equiv 1,5 \pmod 6$
- Properties: Biconnected, Hamiltonian

In mathematics, a queen's graph is an undirected graph that represents all legal moves of the queen—a chess piece—on a chessboard. In the graph, each vertex represents a square on a chessboard, and each edge is a legal move the queen can make; that is, a horizontal, vertical or diagonal move by any number of squares. If the chessboard has dimensions $m\times n$, then the induced graph is called the $m\times n$ queen's graph.

Independent sets of the graphs correspond to placements of multiple queens where no two queens are attacking each other. They are studied in the eight queens puzzle, where eight non-attacking queens are placed on a standard $8\times 8$ chessboard. Dominating sets represent arrangements of queens where every square is attacked or occupied by a queen; five queens, but no fewer, can dominate the $8\times 8$ chessboard.

Colourings of the graphs represent ways to colour each square so that a queen cannot move between any two squares of the same colour; at least n colours are needed for an $n\times n$ chessboard, but 9 colours are needed for the $8\times 8$ board.

== Properties ==
There is a Hamiltonian cycle for each queen's graph, and the graphs are biconnected (they remain connected if any single vertex is removed). The special cases of the $1\times n$ and $2\times 2$ queen's graphs are complete.

== Independence ==
Position: c8 white queen, e7 white queen, b6 white queen, h5 white queen, a4 white queen, g3 white queen, d2 white queen, f1 white queen

An independent set of size 8 for an $8\times 8$ chessboard (such sets are necessarily also dominating).

An independent set of the graph corresponds to a placement of several queens on a chessboard such that no two queens are attacking each other. In an $n\times n$ chessboard, the largest independent set contains at most n vertices, as no two queens can be in the same row or column. This upper bound can be achieved for all n except n=2 and n=3. In the case of n=8, this is the traditional eight queens puzzle.

== Domination ==
A dominating set of the queen's graph corresponds to a placement of queens such that every square on the chessboard is either attacked or occupied by a queen. On an $8\times 8$ chessboard, five queens can dominate, and this is the minimum number possible (four queens leave at least two squares unattacked). There are 4,860 such placements of five queens, including ones where the queens control also all occupied squares, i.e. they attack respectively protect each other. In this subgroup, there are also positions where the queens occupy squares on the main diagonal only (e.g. from a1 to h8), or all on a subdiagonal (e.g. from a2 to g8).

Position: f6 white queen, c5 white queen, e4 white queen, g3 white queen, d2 white queen

A dominating (and independent) set of size 5.

Position: g7 white queen, f6 white queen, e5 white queen, c3 white queen, a1 white queen

A dominating set on the main diagonal.

Position: g8 white queen, e6 white queen, d5 white queen, c4 white queen, a2 white queen

A dominating set on a sub diagonal.

Modifying the graph by replacing the non-looping rectangular $8\times 8$ chessboard with a torus or cylinder reduces the minimum dominating set size to four.

a5 black circle	b5	c5 black circle	d5	e5 black circle
a4	b4 black circle	c4 black circle	d4 black circle	e4
a3 black circle	b3 black circle	c3 black cross	d3 black circle	e3 black circle
a2	b2 black circle	c2 black circle	d2 black circle	e2
a1 black circle	b1	c1 black circle	d1	e1 black circle

Dotted squares are adjacent to the centre square. The 8 non-adjacent squares are adjacent in the corresponding knight's graph.

The $3\times 3$ queen's graph is dominated by the single vertex at the centre of the board. The centre vertex of the $5\times 5$ queen's graph is adjacent to all but 8 vertices: those vertices that are adjacent to the centre vertex of the $5\times 5$ knight's graph.

=== Domination numbers ===
Define the domination number d(n) of an $n\times n$ queen's graph to be the size of the smallest dominating set, and the diagonal domination number dd(n) to be the size of the smallest dominating set that is a subset of the long diagonal. Note that $d(n)\le dd(n)$ for all n. The bound is attained for $d(8)=dd(8)=5$, but not for $d(11)=5,dd(11)=7$.

The domination number is linear in n, with bounds given by:

$$\frac{n-1}{2} \le d(n)\le n-\left \lfloor \frac{n}{3}\right \rfloor.$$

Initial values of d(n), for $n=1,2,3,\dots$, are 1, 1, 1, 2, 3, 3, 4, 5, 5, 5, 5 (sequence A075458 in the OEIS).

Let K_{n} be the maximum size of a subset of $\{1,2,3,\dots,n\}$ such that every number has the same parity and no three numbers form an arithmetic progression (the set is "midpoint-free"). The diagonal domination number of an $n\times n$ queen's graph is $n-K_n$.

Define the independent domination number ID(n) to be the size of the smallest independent, dominant set in an $n\times n$ queen's graph. It is known that $ID(n)<0.705n+0.895$.

== Colouring ==
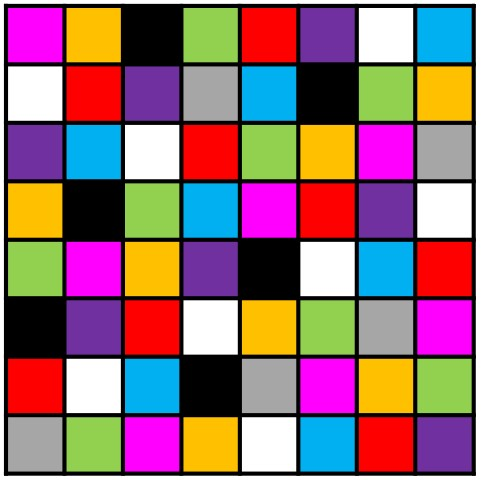
A 9-colouring of the $8\times 8$ queen's graph. Notice that each pair of squares with the same colour are not on the same rank, file or diagonal, so a queen could not move directly between the squares.

A colouring of the queen's graph is an assignment of colours to each vertex such that no two adjacent vertices are given the same colour. For instance, if a8 is coloured red, then no other square on the a-file, eighth rank or long diagonal can be coloured red, as a queen can move from a8 to any of these squares. The chromatic number of the graph is the smallest number of colours that can be used to colour it.

In the case of an $n\times n$ queen's graph, at least n colours are required, as each square in a rank or file needs a different colour (i.e. the rows and columns are cliques). The chromatic number is exactly n if $n\equiv 1,5 \pmod 6$ (i.e. n is one more or one less than a multiple of 6).

The chromatic number of an $8\times 8$ queen's graph is 9.

== Irredundance ==
A set of vertices is irredundant if removing any vertex from the set changes the neighbourhood of the set i.e. for each vertex, there is an adjacent vertex that is not adjacent to any other vertex in the set. This corresponds to a set of queens which each uniquely control at least one square. The maximum size IR(n) of an irredundant set on the $n\times n$ queen's graph is difficult to characterise; known values include $IR(5)=5,IR(6)=7,IR(7)=9,IR(8)=11.$

== Pursuit–evasion game ==
Consider the pursuit–evasion game on an $8\times 8$ queen's graph played according to the following rules: a white queen starts in one corner and a black queen in the opposite corner. Players alternate moves, which consist of moving the queen to an adjacent vertex that can be reached without passing over (horizontally, vertically or diagonally) or landing on a vertex that is adjacent to the opposite queen. This game can be won by white with a pairing strategy.

== See also ==
- King's graph
- Knight's graph
- Rook's graph
- Bishop's graph
