= King's graph =

Graph of king moves on a chessboard

- $8\times 8$ king's graph
- Vertices: $nm$
- Edges: $4nm-3(n+m)+2$
- Girth: $3$ when $\min(m,n)>1$
- Chromatic number: $4$ when $\min(m,n)>1$
- Chromatic index: $8$ when $\min(m,n)>2$

In graph theory, a king's graph is a graph that represents all legal moves of the king chess piece on a chessboard where each vertex represents a square on a chessboard and each edge is a legal move. More specifically, an $n \times m$ king's graph is a king's graph of an $n \times m$ chessboard. It is the map graph formed from the squares of a chessboard by making a vertex for each square and an edge for each two squares that share an edge or a corner. It can also be constructed as the strong product of two path graphs.

For an $n \times m$ king's graph the total number of vertices is $n m$ and the number of edges is $4nm -3(n + m) + 2$. For a square $n \times n$ king's graph this simplifies so that the total number of vertices is $n^2$ and the total number of edges is $(2n-2)(2n-1)$.

The neighbourhood of a vertex in the king's graph corresponds to the Moore neighborhood for cellular automata. A generalization of the king's graph, called a kinggraph, is formed from a squaregraph (a planar graph in which each bounded face is a quadrilateral and each interior vertex has at least four neighbors) by adding the two diagonals of every quadrilateral face of the squaregraph.

In the drawing of a king's graph obtained from an $n\times m$ chessboard, there are $(n-1)(m-1)$ crossings, but it is possible to obtain a drawing with fewer crossings by connecting the two nearest neighbors of each corner square by a curve outside the chessboard instead of by a diagonal line segment. In this way, $(n-1)(m-1)-4$ crossings are always possible. For the king's graph of small chessboards, other drawings lead to even fewer crossings; in particular every $2\times n$ king's graph is a planar graph. However, when both $n$ and $m$ are at least four, and they are not both equal to four, $(n-1)(m-1)-4$ is the optimal number of crossings.

== See also ==
- Knight's graph
- Queen's graph
- Rook's graph
- Bishop's graph
- Lattice graph
