= Graph power =

Graph of short distances in another graph

The square of a graph

In graph theory, a branch of mathematics, the kth power G^{k} of an undirected graph G is another graph that has the same set of vertices, but in which two vertices are adjacent when their distance in G is at most k. Powers of graphs are referred to using terminology similar to that of exponentiation of numbers: G^{2} is called the square of G, G^{3} is called the cube of G, etc.

Graph powers should be distinguished from the products of a graph with itself, which (unlike powers) generally have many more vertices than the original graph.

== Properties ==
If a graph has diameter d, then its d-th power is the complete graph. If a graph family has bounded clique-width, then so do its d-th powers for any fixed d.

=== Coloring ===
Graph coloring on the square of a graph may be used to assign frequencies to the participants of wireless communication networks so that no two participants interfere with each other at any of their common neighbors, and to find graph drawings with high angular resolution.

Both the chromatic number and the degeneracy of the kth power of a planar graph of maximum degree Δ are O(Δ^{⌊k/2⌋}), where the degeneracy bound shows that a greedy coloring algorithm may be used to color the graph with this many colors. For the special case of a square of a planar graph, Wegner conjectured in 1977 that the chromatic number of the square of a planar graph is at most max(Δ + 5, 3Δ/2 + 1), and it is known that the chromatic number is at most 5Δ/3 + O(1). More generally, for any graph with degeneracy d and maximum degree Δ, the degeneracy of the square of the graph is O(dΔ), so many types of sparse graph other than the planar graphs also have squares whose chromatic number is proportional to Δ.

Although the chromatic number of the square of a nonplanar graph with maximum degree Δ may be proportional to Δ^{2} in the worst case, it is smaller for graphs of high girth, being bounded by O(Δ^{2} / log Δ) in this case.

Determining the minimum number of colors needed to color the square of a graph is NP-hard, even in the planar case.

=== Hamiltonicity ===
The cube of every connected graph necessarily contains a Hamiltonian cycle. It is not necessarily the case that the square of a connected graph is Hamiltonian, and it is NP-complete to determine whether the square is Hamiltonian. Nevertheless, by Fleischner's theorem, the square of a 2-vertex-connected graph is always Hamiltonian.

== Computational complexity ==
The kth power of a graph with n vertices and m edges may be computed in time O(mn) by performing a breadth first search starting from each vertex to determine the distances to all other vertices, or slightly faster using more sophisticated algorithms. Alternatively, If A is an adjacency matrix for the graph, modified to have nonzero entries on its main diagonal, then the nonzero entries of A^{k} give the adjacency matrix of the kth power of the graph, from which it follows that constructing kth powers may be performed in an amount of time that is within a logarithmic factor of the time for matrix multiplication.

The kth powers of trees can be recognized in time linear in the size of the input graph.

Given a graph, deciding whether it is the square of another graph is NP-complete. Moreover, it is NP-complete to determine whether a graph is a kth power of another graph, for a given number k ≥ 2, or whether it is a kth power of a bipartite graph, for k > 2.

== In directed graphs ==
The square of a digraph

For the square of directed graphs (or digraphs), each pair of vertices connected by a directed path of length two become connected by a path in the same direction of length one. Pairs of points directed to the same vertex, then, do not cause a connection between them in the square of a directed graph.

The second neighborhood problem can be stated in terms of the square of a digraph, asking if there exists a vertex in every oriented graph whose degree increase by at least a factor of two when the graph is squared.

== Induced subgraphs ==
K_{4} as the half-square of a cube graph

The half-square of a bipartite graph G is the subgraph of G^{2} induced by one side of the bipartition of G. Map graphs are the half-squares of planar graphs, and halved cube graphs are the half-squares of hypercube graphs.

Leaf powers are the subgraphs of powers of trees induced by the leaves of the tree. A k-leaf power is a leaf power whose exponent is k.
