= Rainbow matching =

Edge-colored graph matching where all edges have distinct colors

In the mathematical discipline of graph theory, a rainbow matching in an edge-colored graph is a matching in which all the edges have distinct colors.

== Definition ==
Given an edge-colored graph G = (V, E), a rainbow matching M in G is a set of pairwise non-adjacent edges, that is, no two edges share a common vertex, such that all the edges in the set have distinct colors.

A maximum rainbow matching is a rainbow matching that contains the largest possible number of edges.

== History ==
On the top left a Latin square, on the bottom left the relative proper n-edge coloring. On the top right a Latin transversal and on the bottom right the relative rainbow matching.

Rainbow matchings are of particular interest given their connection to transversals of Latin squares.

Denote by K_{n,n} the complete bipartite graph on n + n vertices. Every proper n-edge coloring of K_{n,n} corresponds to a Latin square of order n. A rainbow matching then corresponds to a transversal of the Latin square, meaning a selection of n positions, one in each row and each column, containing distinct entries.

This connection between transversals of Latin squares and rainbow matchings in K_{n,n} has inspired additional interest in the study of rainbow matchings in triangle-free graphs.

== Existence when each edge has a single color ==
An edge-coloring is called proper if each edge has a single color, and each two edges of the same color have no vertex in common.

A proper edge-coloring does not guarantee the existence of a perfect rainbow matching. For example, consider the graph K_{2,2}: the complete bipartite graph on 2+2 vertices. Suppose the edges (x_{1},y_{1}) and (x_{2},y_{2}) are colored green, and the edges (x_{1},y_{2}) and (x_{2},y_{1}) are colored blue. This is a proper coloring, but there are only two perfect matchings, and each of them is colored by a single color. This invokes the question: when does a large rainbow matching is guaranteed to exist?

=== Bounds depending only on the number of vertices ===
Much of the research on this question was published using the terminology of Latin transversals in Latin squares. Translated into the rainbow matching terminology:

- In 1967, H. J. Ryser conjectured that, when n is odd, every proper edge-coloring of K_{n,n} has a rainbow matching of size n.
- In 1975, S. K. Stein and Brualdi conjectured that, when n is even, every proper edge-coloring of K_{n,n} has a rainbow matching of size n – 1. (it is known that a rainbow matching of size n need not exist in this case).

A more general conjecture of Stein is that a rainbow matching of size n – 1 exists not only for a proper edge-coloring, but for any coloring in which each color appears on exactly n edges.

Some weaker versions of these conjectures have been proved:

- Every proper edge-coloring of K_{n,n} has a rainbow matching of size 2n/3.
- Every proper edge-coloring of K_{n,n} has a rainbow matching of size $n - \sqrt{n}.$
- Every proper edge-coloring of K_{n,n} has a rainbow matching of size n – 11 log_{2}^{2}(n).
- Every proper edge-coloring of K_{n,n} has a rainbow matching of size n – O(log n/log log n).
- Every proper edge-coloring of K_{n,n} has a rainbow matching of size n – 1. (Preprint)

=== Bounds depending on the minimum degree ===
Wang asked if there is a function f(d) such that every properly edge-colored graph G with minimum degree d and at least f(d) vertices must have a rainbow matching of size d. Obviously at least 2d vertices are necessary, but how many are sufficient?

- Diemunsch, et al. answered this question in the affirmative and showed that given a properly edge-colored graph G with minimum degree d and order at least f(d) = 13d/2−23/2+41/(8d), there exists a rainbow matching of size d in G.
- This bound was later improved to f(d) = 4d – 3 by Andras Gyarfas and Gabor N. Sarkozy. They also show that any graph with at least 2d vertices has a rainbow matching of size at least d – 2d^{2/3}. These are the best known estimate to date.

== Existence when the same edge may have different colors ==
Suppose that each edge may have several different colors, while each two edges of the same color must still have no vertex in common. In other words, each color is a matching. How many colors are needed in order to guarantee the existence of a rainbow matching?

=== In complete bipartite graphs ===
Drisko studied this question using the terminology of Latin rectangles. He proved that, for any n ≤ k, in the complete bipartite graph K_{n,k}, any family of 2n – 1 matchings (=colors) of size n has a perfect rainbow matching (of size n). He applied this theorem to questions about group actions and difference sets.

Drisko also showed that 2n – 1 matchings may be necessary: consider a family of 2n – 2 matchings, of which n – 1 are { (x_{1}, y_{1}), (x_{2}, y_{2}), ..., (x_{n}, y_{n})} and the other n – 1 are {(x_{1}, y_{2}), (x_{2}, y_{3}), …, (x_{n}, y_{1}) }. Then the largest rainbow matching is of size n – 1 (e.g. take one edge from each of the first n – 1 matchings).

Alon showed that Drisko's theorem implies an older result in additive number theory.

=== In general bipartite graphs ===
Aharoni and Berger generalized Drisko's theorem to any bipartite graph, namely: any family of 2n – 1 matchings of size n in a bipartite graph has a rainbow matching of size n.

Aharoni, Kotlar and Ziv showed that Drisko's extremal example is unique in any bipartite graph.

=== In general graphs ===
In general graphs, 2n – 1 matchings are no longer sufficient. When n is even, one can add to Drisko's example the matching { (x_{1}, x_{2}), (y_{1}, y_{2}), (x_{2}, x_{3}), (y_{2}, y_{3}), … } and get a family of 2n – 1 matchings without any rainbow matching.

Aharoni, Berger, Chudnovsky, Howard and Seymour proved that, in a general graph, 3n – 2 matchings (=colors) are always sufficient. It is not known whether this is tight: currently the best lower bound for even n is 2n and for odd n it is 2n – 1.

== Rainbow fractional matchings ==
A fractional matching is a set of edges with a non-negative weight assigned to each edge, such that the sum of weights adjacent to each vertex is at most 1. The size of a fractional matching is the sum of weights of all edges. It is a generalization of a matching, and can be used to generalize both the colors and the rainbow matching:

- Instead of requiring that each color be a matching of size n, the requirement is weakened: each "color" can be an arbitrary set of edges, but it should admit a fractional matching of size at least n.
- Instead of looking for a rainbow matching, we look for a rainbow fractional matching - a fractional matching in which each edge with a positive weight has a different color.

It is known that, in a bipartite graph, the maximum fractional matching size equals the maximum matching size. Therefore, the theorem of Aharoni and Berger is equivalent to the following. Let n be any positive integer. Given any family of 2n – 1 fractional-matchings (=colors) of size n in a bipartite graph, there exists a rainbow-fractional-matching of size n.

Aharoni, Holzman and Jiang extend this theorem to arbitrary graphs as follows. Let n be any positive integer or half-integer. Any family of 2n fractional-matchings (=colors) of size at least n in an arbitrary graph has a rainbow-fractional-matching of size n. The 2n is the smallest possible for fractional matchings in arbitrary graphs: the extremal case is constructed using an odd-length cycle.

=== Partial proof ===
For the case of perfect fractional matchings, both the above theorems can derived from the colorful Carathéodory theorem.

For every edge e in E, let 1_{e} be a vector of size |V|, where for each vertex v in V, element v in 1_{e} equals 1 if e is adjacent to v, and 0 otherwise (so each vector 1_{e} has 2 ones and |V|-2 zeros). Every fractional matching corresponds to a conical combination of edges, in which each element is at most 1. A conical combination in which each element is exactly 1 corresponds to a perfect fractional matching. In other words, a collection F of edges admits a perfect fractional matching, if and only if 1_{v} (the vector of |V| ones) is contained in the conical hull of the vectors 1_{e} for e in F.

Consider a graph with 2n vertices, and suppose there are 2n subsets of edges, each of which admits a perfect fractional matching (of size n). This means that the vector 1_{v} is in the conical hull of each of these n subsets. By the colorful Carathéodory theorem, there exists a selection of 2n edges, one from each subset, that their conical hull contains 1_{v}. This corresponds to a rainbow perfect fractional matching. The expression 2n is the dimension of the vectors 1_{e} - each vector has 2n elements.

Now, suppose that the graph is bipartite. In a bipartite graph, there is a constraint on the vectors 1_{e}: the sum of elements corresponding to each part of the graph must be 1. Therefore, the vectors 1_{e} live in a (2n – 1)-dimensional space. Therefore, the same argument as above holds when there are only 2n – 1 subsets of edges.

== Rainbow matching in hypergraphs ==
An r-uniform hypergraph is a set of hyperedges each of which contains exactly r vertices (so a 2-uniform hypergraph is a just a graph without self-loops). Aharoni, Holzman and Jiang extend their theorem to such hypergraphs as follows. Let n be any positive rational number. Any family of ⌈r⋅n⌉ fractional-matchings (=colors) of size at least n in an r-uniform hypergraph has a rainbow-fractional-matching of size n. The ⌈r⋅n⌉ is the smallest possible when n is an integer.

An r-partite hypergraph is an r-uniform hypergraph in which the vertices are partitioned into r disjoint sets and each hyperedge contains exactly one vertex of each set (so a 2-partite hypergraph is a just bipartite graph). Let n be any positive integer. Any family of rn – r + 1 fractional-matchings (=colors) of size at least n in an r-partite hypergraph has a rainbow-fractional-matching of size n. The rn – r + 1 is the smallest possible: the extremal case is when n = r – 1 is a prime power, and all colors are edges of the truncated projective plane of order n. So each color has n^{2} = rn – r + 1 edges and a fractional matching of size n, but any fractional matching of that size requires all rn – r + 1 edges.

=== Partial proof ===
For the case of perfect fractional matchings, both the above theorems can derived from the colorful Carathéodory theorem in the previous section. For a general r-uniform hypergraph (admitting a perfect matching of size n), the vectors 1_{e} live in a (rn)-dimensional space. For an r-uniform r-partite hypergraph, the r-partiteness constraints imply that the vectors 1_{e} live in a (rn – r + 1)-dimensional space.

=== Notes ===
The above results hold only for rainbow fractional matchings. In contrast, the case of rainbow integral matchings in r-uniform hypergraphs is much less understood. The number of required matchings for a rainbow matching of size n grows at least exponentially with n.

== Computation ==
Garey and Johnson have shown that computing a maximum rainbow matching is NP-complete even for edge-colored bipartite graphs.

== Applications ==
Rainbow matchings have been applied for solving packing problems.

== See also ==
- Rainbow coloring
- Rainbow-colorable hypergraph
- Rainbow-independent set
- Rainbow covering
- Hall-type theorems for hypergraphs
