= Strimko =

A Strimko puzzle...

...and its solution

Strimko is a logic number puzzle invented in 2008 by the Grabarchuk family. Like Sudoku and KenKen, Strimko asks the puzzle-solver to complete a Latin square under certain constraints.

A Strimko puzzle consists of an N×N grid of cells, partitioned into N regions of N cells each; these regions are called "streams." The solver's goal is to fill each cell with a number from 1 to N, such that no row contains the same number twice; no column contains the same number twice; and no stream contains the same number twice.

== Relation to other puzzles ==
A nonomino or jigsaw Sudoku, as seen in The Sunday Telegraph...

...and its solution (red numbers)

Every Sudoku puzzle is a valid Strimko puzzle; a Sudoku is simply a Strimko in which the "streams" correspond to the nine subgrids. Puzzles equivalent to Strimko are often published under the name "Jigsaw Sudoku"; this name appears in print as early as 2008.

== Book and mobile games ==
Strimko
- Developers: Puzzlium Inc., Quokka Studios Pty Ltd, Braintonik, Grabarchuk Puzzles
- Publishers: Puzzlium Inc., Quokka Studios Pty Ltd, Braintonik, Grabarchuk Puzzles
- Platforms: Paperback, iOS, Kindle, Windows, Mac OS X, Web
- Release: Paperback/Kindle Book; October 2017; Kindle Game; November 2011; PC/Mac Game; February 2010 iOS App; September 2009; Web Game; January 2008
- Genre: Puzzle
- Mode: Single player

Strimko challenges were handcrafted by Helen, Tanya, and Peter Grabarchuk, and hundreds of original Strimko puzzles were published in various forms and platforms: Web, iOS, PC/Mac, Kindle, paperback.

The game received positive reviews from GameZebo (3.5/5), Jay Is Games (4/5) and Softpedia (4.8/5).
