= Halved cube graph =

Graph of the vertices and edges of a demihypercube

- The halved cube graph 1/2Q_{3}
- Vertices: 2^{n−1}
- Edges: n(n − 1)2^{n−3}
- Automorphisms: n! 2^{n−1}, for n > 4 n! 2^{n}, for n = 4 (2^{n−1})!, for n < 4
- Properties: Symmetric; Distance regular Polytopal
- Notation: 1/2Q_{n}

Construction of two demicubes (regular tetrahedra, forming a stella octangula) from a single cube. The halved cube graph of dimension three is the graph of vertices and edges of a single demicube. The halved cube graph of dimension four includes all of the cube vertices and edges, and all of the edges of the two demicubes.

In graph theory, the halved cube graph or half cube graph of dimension n is the vertex-edge graph of the demihypercube, formed by connecting pairs of vertices at distance exactly two from each other in the hypercube graph. That is, it is the half-square of the hypercube. This connectivity pattern produces two isomorphic graphs, disconnected from each other, each of which is the halved cube graph.

== Equivalent constructions ==
The construction of the halved cube graph can be reformulated in terms of binary numbers. The vertices of a hypercube may be labeled by binary numbers in such a way that two vertices are adjacent exactly when they differ in a single bit. The demicube may be constructed from the hypercube as the convex hull of the subset of binary numbers with an even number of nonzero bits (the evil numbers), and its edges connect pairs of numbers whose Hamming distance is exactly two.

It is also possible to construct the halved cube graph from a lower-dimensional hypercube graph, without taking a subset of the vertices:

$$\frac{1}{2}Q_n = Q_{n-1}^2$$

where the superscript 2 denotes the square of the hypercube graph Q_{n − 1}, the graph formed by connecting pairs of vertices whose distance is at most two in the original graph. For instance, the halved cube graph of dimension four may be formed from an ordinary three-dimensional cube by keeping the cube edges and adding edges connecting pairs of vertices that are on opposite corners of the same square face.

== Examples ==
The halved cube graph $\tfrac{1}{2}Q_3$ of dimension 3 is the complete graph K_{4}, the graph of the tetrahedron. The halved cube graph $\tfrac{1}{2}Q_4$ of dimension 4 is K_{2,2,2,2}, the graph of the four-dimensional regular polytope, the 16-cell. The halved cube graph $\tfrac{1}{2}Q_5$ of dimension five is sometimes known as the Clebsch graph, and is the complement of the folded cube graph of dimension five, which is the one more commonly called the Clebsch graph. It exists in the 5-dimensional uniform 5-polytope, the 5-demicube.

== Properties ==
Because it is the bipartite half of a distance-regular graph, the halved cube graph is itself distance-regular. And because it contains a hypercube as a spanning subgraph, it inherits from the hypercube all monotone graph properties, such as the property of containing a Hamiltonian cycle.

As with the hypercube graphs, and their isometric (distance-preserving) subgraphs the partial cubes, a halved cube graph may be embedded isometrically into a real vector space with the Manhattan metric (L_{1} distance function). The same is true for the isometric subgraphs of halved cube graphs, which may be recognized in polynomial time; this forms a key subroutine for an algorithm which tests whether a given graph may be embedded isometrically into a Manhattan metric.

For every halved cube graph of dimension five or more, it is possible to (improperly) color the vertices with two colors, in such a way that the resulting colored graph has no nontrivial symmetries. For the graphs of dimension three and four, four colors are needed to eliminate all symmetries.

== Sequence ==
The two graphs shown are symmetric D_{n} and B_{n} Petrie polygon projections (2(n − 1) and n dihedral symmetry) of the related polytope which can include overlapping edges and vertices.

n	Polytope	Graph	Vertices	Edges
2	Line segment		2	–
3	tetrahedron		4	6
4	16-cell		8	24
5	5-demicube		16	80
6	6-demicube		32	240
7	7-demicube		64	672
8	8-demicube		128	1792
9	9-demicube		256	4608
10	10-demicube		512	11520
