= Second neighborhood problem =

Unsolved problem about oriented graphs

For any oriented graph, the conjecture states that at least one vertex $v$ (here, the white vertex) can be found with a number of first neighbors (blue vertices) less than or equal to the number of second neighbors (red vertices).

In mathematics, the second neighborhood problem is an unsolved problem about oriented graphs posed by Paul Seymour. Intuitively, it suggests that in a social network described by such a graph, someone will have at least as many friends-of-friends as friends.

The problem is also known as the second neighborhood conjecture or Seymour’s distance two conjecture.

== Statement ==
An oriented graph is a finite directed graph obtained from a simple undirected graph by assigning an orientation to each edge. Equivalently, it is a directed graph that has no self-loops, no parallel edges, and no two-edge cycles. The first neighborhood of a vertex $v$ (also called its open neighborhood) consists of all vertices at distance one from $v$, and the second neighborhood of $v$ consists of all vertices at distance two from $v$. These two neighborhoods form disjoint sets, neither of which contains $v$ itself.

In 1990, Paul Seymour conjectured that, in every oriented graph, there always exists at least one vertex $v$ whose second neighborhood is at least as large as its first neighborhood. Equivalently, in the square of the graph, the degree of $v$ is at least doubled. The problem was first published by Nathaniel Dean and Brenda J. Latka in 1995, in a paper that studied the problem on a restricted class of oriented graphs, the tournaments (orientations of complete graphs). Dean had previously conjectured that every tournament obeys the second neighborhood conjecture, and this special case became known as Dean's conjecture.

Unsolved problem in mathematics
Does every oriented graph contain a Seymour vertex?
More unsolved problems in mathematics

A vertex in a directed graph whose second neighborhood is at least as large as its first neighborhood is called a Seymour vertex.

In the second neighborhood conjecture, the condition that the graph have no two-edge cycles is necessary, for in graphs that have such cycles (for instance the complete oriented graph) all second neighborhoods may be empty or small.

== Partial results ==
Fisher (1996) proved Dean's conjecture, the special case of the second neighborhood problem for tournaments.

For some graphs, a vertex of minimum out-degree will be a Seymour vertex. For instance, if a directed graph has a sink, a vertex of out-degree zero, then the sink is automatically a Seymour vertex, because its first and second neighborhoods both have size zero. In a graph without sinks, a vertex of out-degree one is always a Seymour vertex. In the orientations of triangle-free graphs, any vertex $v$ of minimum out-degree is again a Seymour vertex, because for any edge from $v$ to another vertex $w$, the out-neighbors of $w$ all belong to the second neighborhood of $v$.

For arbitrary graphs with higher vertex degrees, the vertices of minimum degree might not be Seymour vertices, but the existence of a low-degree vertex can still lead to the existence of a nearby Seymour vertex. Using this sort of reasoning, the second neighborhood conjecture has been proven to be true for any oriented graph that contains at least one vertex of out-degree ≤ 6.. Following this, the conjecture is true for all graphs with a number of vertices ≤ 14, as these must contain at least one vertex with out-degree ≤ 6. This can be improved to graphs with a number of vertices ≤ 15, because the only graphs with 15 vertices and none with out-degree ≤ 6 are tournament graphs.

Every oriented bipartite graph follows the conjecture, as well as all oriented graphs whose vertex set can be partitioned into an independent set and a 2-degenerate graph.

Random tournaments and some random directed graphs have many Seymour vertices with high probability. Every oriented graph has a vertex whose second neighborhood is at least $\gamma$ times as big as the first neighborhood, where

$$\gamma=\frac{1}{6}\left(-1+\sqrt[3]{53-6\sqrt{78}}+\sqrt[3]{53+6\sqrt{78}}\right) \approx 0.657$$

is the real root of the polynomial $2x^3+x^2-1$.

== See also ==
- Friendship paradox
