= Folded cube graph =

Undirected graph derived from a hypercube graph

- The dimension-5 folded cube graph (i.e, the Clebsch graph).
- Vertices: $2^{n-1}$
- Edges: $2^{n-2}n$
- Diameter: $\left\lfloor \frac n 2 \right\rfloor$
- Chromatic number: $$\begin{cases} 2 & \text{even } n \\ 4 & \text{odd } n \end{cases}$$
- Properties: Regular; Hamiltonian; Distance-transitive.

In graph theory, a folded cube graph is an undirected graph formed from a hypercube graph by adding to it a perfect matching that connects opposite pairs of hypercube vertices.

== Construction ==
The folded cube graph of dimension k (containing 2^{k − 1} vertices) may be formed by adding edges between opposite pairs of vertices in a hypercube graph of dimension k − 1. (In a hypercube with 2^{n} vertices, a pair of vertices are opposite if the shortest path between them has length n.) It can, equivalently, be formed from a hypercube graph (also) of dimension k, which has twice as many vertices, by identifying together (or contracting) every opposite pair of vertices.

== Properties ==
A dimension-k folded cube graph is a k-regular with 2^{k − 1} vertices and 2^{k − 2}k edges.

The chromatic number of the dimension-k folded cube graph is two when k is even (that is, in this case, the graph is bipartite) and four when k is odd. The odd girth of a folded cube of odd dimension is k, so for odd k greater than three the folded cube graphs provide a class of triangle-free graphs with chromatic number four and arbitrarily large odd girth. As a distance-regular graph with odd girth k and diameter (k − 1)/2, the folded cubes of odd dimension are examples of generalized odd graphs.

When k is odd, the bipartite double cover of the dimension-k folded cube is the dimension-k cube from which it was formed. However, when k is even, the dimension-k cube is a double cover but not the bipartite double cover. In this case, the folded cube is itself already bipartite. Folded cube graphs inherit from their hypercube subgraphs the property of having a Hamiltonian cycle, and from the hypercubes that double cover them the property of being a distance-transitive graph.

When k is odd, the dimension-k folded cube contains as a subgraph a complete binary tree with 2^{k-1} − 1 nodes. However, when k is even, this is not possible, because in this case the folded cube is a bipartite graph with equal numbers of vertices on each side of the bipartition, very different from the nearly two-to-one ratio for the bipartition of a complete binary tree.

== Examples ==
- The folded cube graph of dimension three is a complete graph K_{4}.
- The folded cube graph of dimension four is the complete bipartite graph K_{4,4}.
- The folded cube graph of dimension five is the Clebsch graph.
- The folded cube graph of dimension six is the Kummer graph, i.e. the Levi graph of the Kummer point-plane configuration.

== Applications ==
In parallel computing, folded cube graphs have been studied as a potential network topology, as an alternative to the hypercube. Compared to a hypercube, a folded cube with the same number of nodes has nearly the same vertex degree but only half the diameter. Efficient distributed algorithms (relative to those for a hypercube) are known for broadcasting information in a folded cube.

== See also ==
- Halved cube graph
