= Nathaniel Dean (mathematician) =

American mathematician and educator

- Education: Mississippi State University, Northeastern University, Vanderbilt University
- Known for: Graph Theory, Data Visualization, Parallel Computing
- Awards: Bell Labs President's Silver Award (1997)
- Scientific career
- Fields: Applied mathematics
- Workplaces: Bell Labs, Rice University, Texas Southern University, Texas State University
- Thesis: Contractible Edges and Conjectures about Path and Cycle Numbers (1987)
- Doctoral advisor: Robert Louis Hemminger

Nathaniel Dean (January 9, 1956 – January 2021) was an African-American mathematician and educator who made contributions to abstract and algorithmic graph theory, as well as data visualization and parallel computing.

== Education ==
Dean received his B.S. in Mathematics and Physics from Mississippi State University in 1978. He then received his M.S. in Applied Mathematics from Northeastern University in 1983. He received his Ph.D. in Mathematics from Vanderbilt University in 1987, with a doctoral thesis titled "Contractible Edges and Conjectures about Path and Cycle Numbers".

== Scientific career ==
For the next eleven years, he worked at the Software Production Research Department of Bell Labs, where he would author over thirty scientific publications on graph theory, graph algorithms, parallel computing, and data visualization. In 1995 he posed a conjecture which led to progress on the second neighborhood problem, which remains open as of 2020. His work on using graph theory for data mining was featured in the PBS series Life by the Numbers.

In 1997 Dean received the Bell Labs President's Silver Award, and shortly thereafter began a professorship at Rice University. While at Rice, he supervised four Ph.D. students with thesis topics ranging from algorithmic graph theory to biological computing. On January 11, 2001, Dean was elected vice president of the National Association of Mathematicians (NAM). In 2003 he moved from Rice University to Texas Southern University, where he attained the rank of full professor and would serve as chair of the mathematics department.

Dean's departure from Texas Southern University to Texas State University was announced in a NAM newsletter in 2006. Dean focused on mathematics education and outreach throughout his time at Texas State, most notably by serving as President of NAM from 2005 to 2015. His research activities during this time include graph theory and an influential article on data visualization. He retired from Texas State in 2016.

== Outreach ==
Dean was actively involved in mathematics education and outreach throughout his career. In addition to his involvement in the PBS series Life by the Numbers, he developed software to teach discrete mathematics at the K-12 level. Much of Dean's outreach was through the National Association of Mathematicians (NAM), a nonprofit which aims to promote the mathematical development of underrepresented minorities; his involvement with NAM includes serving as vice president (2001-2004) and president (2005-2015).

Separate from his involvement with NAM, Dean worked with the American Mathematical Society to publish two conference proceeding on African American mathematicians. Dean also served as an associate editor of the Notices of the AMS from 2001 to 2006.

Dean was quite involved with other professional societies in mathematics as well. He served on the board of governors of the Mathematical Association of America from 2005 to 2007, and served as chair of MSRI's Human Resources Advisory Committee (HRAC) from 2005 to 2007. In 2010, he gave the Pi Mu Epsilon J. Sutherland Frame Lecture on "Incomprehensibility".

Dean's fifth and final Ph.D. student graduated from Texas State University in 2010, with a thesis on secondary school mathematics pedagogy.
