= Lévy family of graphs =

In graph theory, a branch of mathematics, a Lévy family of graphs is a family of graphs G_{n}, n = 1, 2, 3, ..., which possess a certain type of "compactness" or "tangledness". Many naturally occurring families of graphs are Lévy families. Many mathematicians have noted this fact and have expressed surprise that it does not appear to have a ready explanation.

Formally, a family of graphs G_{n}, n = 1, 2, 3, ..., is a Lévy family if, for any $\varepsilon>0$

$$\lim_{n\longrightarrow\infty}\alpha\left(G_n,\varepsilon\right) =0$$

where

$$\alpha(G,\varepsilon) = \max \left\{ 1-\frac{\left|A_{(\varepsilon D)}\right|}{|G|}\,:\, A\subseteq G, |A|>|G|/2 \right\}.$$

Here D is the graph diameter of G, and A_{(n)} is the n-graph neighborhood of A. Note that the maximization ranges over subsets A of G, subject to A being over half the size of G

In words, this means that one can take a subset of size at least half of G, and blow it up by only $\epsilon$ of the graph diameter, and end up with nearly all the set.

Long "stringy" (i.e. not "compact") families of graphs such as the cycle graph of order n clearly don't have such a property: one could consider a subset comprising the n/2 neighborhood of a point (midnight to six o'clock, say). The graph has graph diameter D of about n/2. So the $\epsilon D$-neighborhood of the subset is only of size about n/2. A Levy family would have this neighborhood covering almost all the set. It should be clear that a Levy family must have a very special type of compact structure.

- Hypercube graphs of order n are known to be a Lévy family.
- If S_{n} is the graph with points that are elements of the permutation group of n elements, with edges joining points that differ by a transposition, then the series S_{i}, i=1,2,..., is a Lévy family.
