= Futoshiki =

Logic puzzle game

Futoshiki (不等式, futōshiki), or More or Less, is a logic puzzle game from Japan. Its name means "inequality". It is also spelled hutosiki (using Kunrei-shiki romanization). Futoshiki was developed by Tamaki Seto in 2001.

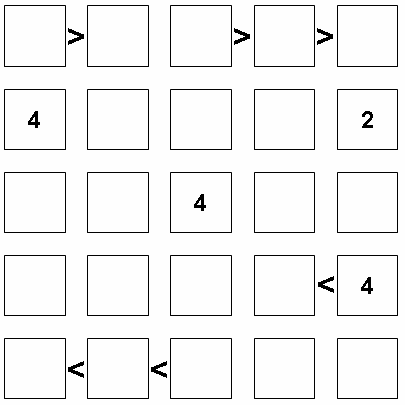
An example of a 5×5 Futoshiki puzzle ...

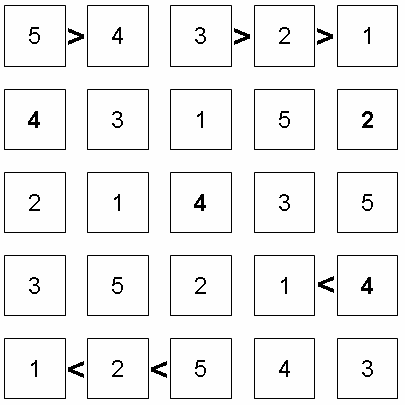
... and its solution

The puzzle is played on a square grid. The objective is to place the numbers such that each row and column intersection contains only one of each digit. Some digits may be given at the start. Inequality constraints are initially specified between some of the squares, such that one must be higher or lower than its neighbor. These constraints must be honored in order to complete the puzzle.

== Strategy ==
Solving the puzzle requires a combination of logical techniques. Numbers in each row and column restrict the number of possible values for each position, as do the inequalities.

Once the table of possibilities has been determined, a crucial tactic to solve the puzzle involves "AB elimination", in which subsets are identified within a row whose range of values can be determined.

Another important technique is to work through the range of possibilities in open inequalities. A value on one side of an inequality determines others, which then can be worked through the puzzle until a contradiction is reached and the first value is excluded.

A solved futoshiki puzzle is a Latin square.

== Futoshiki in the United Kingdom ==
A futoshiki puzzle is published in the following UK newspapers:

- The Daily Telegraph — Saturdays
- Dundee Courier — daily
- i — Mondays through Fridays
- The Guardian — Saturdays
- The Times — daily
