= Hypercube graph =

Graphs formed by a hypercube's edges and vertices

- The hypercube graph $Q_4$
- Vertices: $2^n$
- Edges: $2^{n-1}n$
- Diameter: $n$
- Girth: 4 if $n\ge 2$
- Automorphisms: $n!2^n$
- Chromatic number: 2
- Spectrum: $\{(n - 2 k)^{\binom{n}{k}}; k = 0, \ldots, n\}$
- Properties: Symmetric; Distance regular Unit distance Hamiltonian; Bipartite; Polytopal
- Notation: $Q_n$

In graph theory, the hypercube graph $Q_n$ is the edge graph of the $n$-dimensional hypercube, that is, it is the graph formed from the vertices and edges of the hypercube. For instance, the cube graph $Q_3$ is the graph formed by the 8 vertices and 12 edges of a three-dimensional cube. $Q_n$ has $2^n$ vertices, $2^{n-1}n$ edges, and is a regular graph with $n$ edges touching each vertex.

The hypercube graph $Q_n$ may also be constructed by creating a vertex for each subset of an $n$-element set, with two vertices adjacent when their subsets differ in a single element, or by creating a vertex for each $n$-digit binary number, with two vertices adjacent when their binary representations differ in a single digit. It is the $n$-fold Cartesian product of the two-vertex complete graph, and may be decomposed into two copies of $Q_{n-1}$ connected to each other by a perfect matching.

Hypercube graphs should not be confused with cubic graphs, which are graphs that have exactly three edges touching each vertex. The only hypercube graph $Q_n$ that is a cubic graph is the cubical graph $Q_3$.

== Construction ==
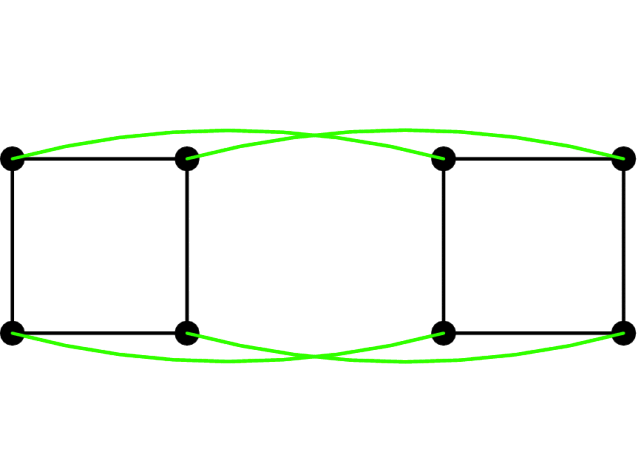
Construction of Q_{3} by connecting pairs of corresponding vertices in two copies of Q_{2}

The hypercube graph $Q_n$ may be constructed from the family of subsets of a set with $n$ elements, by making a vertex for each possible subset and joining two vertices by an edge whenever the corresponding subsets differ in a single element. Equivalently, it may be constructed using $2^n$ vertices labeled with $n$-bit binary numbers and connecting two vertices by an edge whenever the Hamming distance of their labels is one. These two constructions are closely related: a binary number may be interpreted as a set (the set of positions where it has a nonzero digit), and two such sets differ in a single element whenever the corresponding two binary numbers have Hamming distance one.

Alternatively, $Q_n$ may be constructed from the disjoint union of two hypercubes $Q_{n-1}$, by adding an edge from each vertex in one copy of $Q_{n-1}$ to the corresponding vertex in the other copy, as shown in the figure. The joining edges form a perfect matching.

The above construction gives a recursive algorithm for constructing the adjacency matrix of a hypercube, $A_n$. Copying is done via the Kronecker product $\otimes_K$, so that the two copies of $Q_{n-1}$ have an adjacency matrix $\mathrm{1}_2\otimes_K A_{n-1}$,where $1_d$ is the $d\times d$ identity matrix. Meanwhile the joining edges have an adjacency matrix $A_{1} \otimes_K 1_{2^{n-1} }$. The sum of these two terms gives a recursive function for the adjacency matrix of a hypercube:
$$A_{n} = \begin{cases}
1_2\otimes_K A_{n-1}+A_1\otimes_K 1_{2^{n-1}} & \text{if } n>1\\
\begin{bmatrix}
0 & 1\\
1 & 0
\end{bmatrix}
&\text{if }n=1
\end{cases}$$
Another construction of $Q_n$ is the Cartesian product of $n$ two-vertex complete graphs $K_2$. More generally the Cartesian product of copies of a complete graph is called a Hamming graph; the hypercube graphs are examples of Hamming graphs.

== Examples ==
The graph $Q_0$ consists of a single vertex, while $Q_1$ is the complete graph on two vertices.

$Q_2$ is a cycle of length 4.

The graph $Q_3$ is the 1-skeleton of a cube and is a planar graph with eight vertices and twelve edges.

The graph $Q_4$ is the Levi graph of the Möbius configuration. It is also the knight's graph for a toroidal $4\times 4$ chessboard.

== Properties ==
=== Bipartiteness ===
Every hypercube graph is bipartite: it can be colored with only two colors. The two colors of this coloring may be found from the subset construction of hypercube graphs, by giving one color to the subsets that have an even number of elements and the other color to the subsets with an odd number of elements.

=== Hamiltonicity ===
A Hamiltonian cycle on a tesseract with vertices labelled with a 4-bit cyclic Gray code

Every hypercube $Q_n$ with $n>1$ has a Hamiltonian cycle, a cycle that visits each vertex exactly once. Additionally, a Hamiltonian path exists between two vertices $u$ and $v$ if and only if they have different colors in a 2-coloring of the graph. Both facts are easy to prove using the principle of induction on the dimension of the hypercube, and the construction of the hypercube graph by joining two smaller hypercubes with a matching.

Hamiltonicity of the hypercube is tightly related to the theory of Gray codes. More precisely there is a bijective correspondence between the set of $n$-bit cyclic Gray codes and the set of Hamiltonian cycles in the hypercube $Q_n$. An analogous property holds for acyclic $n$-bit Gray codes and Hamiltonian paths.

A lesser known fact is that every perfect matching in the hypercube extends to a Hamiltonian cycle. The question whether every matching extends to a Hamiltonian cycle remains an open problem.

=== Other properties ===
The hypercube graph $Q_n$ (for $n>1$) :

- is the Hasse diagram of a finite Boolean algebra.
- is a median graph. Every median graph is an isometric subgraph of a hypercube, and can be formed as a retraction of a hypercube.
- has more than $2^{2^{n-2}}$ perfect matchings. (this is another consequence that follows easily from the inductive construction.)
- is arc transitive and symmetric. The symmetries of hypercube graphs can be represented as signed permutations.
- contains all the cycles of length $4,6,\dots 2^n$ and is thus a bipancyclic graph.
- can be drawn as a unit distance graph in the Euclidean plane by using the construction of the hypercube graph from subsets of a set of $n$ elements, choosing a distinct unit vector for each set element, and placing the vertex corresponding to the set $S$ at the sum of the vectors in $S$.
- is a n-vertex-connected graph, by Balinski's theorem.
- is planar (can be drawn with no crossings) if and only if $n\le 3$. For larger values of $n$, the hypercube has genus $(n-4)2^{n-3}+1$.
- has exactly $2^{2^n-n-1}\prod_{k=2}^n k^{{n\choose k}}$ spanning trees.
- has bandwidth exactly $\sum_{i=0}^{n-1} \binom{i}{\lfloor i/2\rfloor}$.
- has achromatic number proportional to $\sqrt{n2^n}$, but the constant of proportionality is not known precisely.
- has as the eigenvalues of its adjacency matrix the numbers $\{-n,-n+2,-n+4,\dots,n-4,n-2,n\}$ and as the eigenvalues of its Laplacian matrix the numbers $\{0,2,\dots,2n\}$. The $k$th eigenvalue has multiplicity $\binom{n}{k}$ in both cases.
- has isoperimetric number $h(G)=1$.

The family $Q_n$ for all $n>1$ is a Lévy family of graphs.

== Problems ==
Maximum lengths of snakes (L_{s}) and coils (L_{c}) in the snakes-in-the-box problem for dimensions n from 1 to 4

The problem of finding the longest path or cycle that is an induced subgraph of a given hypercube graph is known as the snake-in-the-box problem.

Szymanski's conjecture concerns the suitability of a hypercube as a network topology for communications. It states that, no matter how one chooses a permutation connecting each hypercube vertex to another vertex with which it should be connected, there is always a way to connect these pairs of vertices by paths that do not share any directed edge.

== See also ==
- de Bruijn graph
- Cube-connected cycles
- Fibonacci cube
- Folded cube graph
- Frankl–Rödl graph
- Halved cube graph
- Hypercube internetwork topology
- Partial cube
