= DQZ =

DQZ can refer to:

- DQZ, a type of white dwarf in stellar classification; see White dwarf#Nearest
- Orussidae, a family of flies also known as the "parasitic wood wasps", by 4 of Life identifier
- Direct-quadrature-zero transformation, a type of rotation in 3D space, used in electrical engineering
