= Short circuit ratio (synchronous generator) =

In a synchronous generator, the short circuit ratio is the ratio of field current required to produce rated armature voltage at the open circuit to the field current required to produce the rated armature current at short circuit. This ratio can also be expressed as an inverse of the saturated direct-axis synchronous reactance (in p.u.):

$$SCR = \frac 1 {X_S}$$

== Effects of SCR values ==
Higher SCR requires lower reactance $X_S$ that in practice means a larger air gap.

Both high and low levels of SCR have their benefits:

- low SCR:
  - in case of a short circuit, the current is proportional to SCR, therefore generators with low SCR require less protection and thus are cheaper;
  - low SCR allows shorter air gap and lower excitation field, both decreasing the size (an cost) of the generator;
  - with low SCR the amounts of iron and copper are reduced, lowering the cost;
- high SCR:
  - generator with high SCR provides more power when overloaded, improving the system stability in case of a contingency;
  - high SCR inherently provides lower voltage variations in case of an oscillatory load, thus contributing to system stability;
  - high-SCR generator has more synchronizing power, making it easier to operate generators in parallel.

Therefore, in practice the design of a generator is seeking an SCR that balances benefits and drawbacks for a particular application.

SCR is a measure of the electrical stiffness (also known as a synchronizing coefficient) of the machine. Synchronization coefficient is proportional to the SCR. A stiff machine has a higher SCR, is more loosely coupled to the network and thus is slower in following. A less stiff machine with lower SCR (a typical situation for modern generators) will follow the grid faster. Stiffness is a ratio of the change in power output to the change of power angle. For example, if the system frequency decreases, the stiffer generator provides more power thus contributing to the system stability.

== Effects of construction ==
The larger the SCR, the smaller is alternator reactance (Xd) and inductance Ld. This is the result of larger air gaps in generator design (As in Hydro generators or Salient Pole Machines). It results into Machine loosely coupled to the grid, and its response will be slow. This increases the machines’ stability while operating on the grid, but simultaneously will increase the short circuit current delivery capability of the machine (higher short circuit current) and subsequently larger machine size and its cost. Typical values of SCR for Hydro alternators may be in the range of 1 to 1.5.

Conversely, the smaller the SCR, the larger is alternator's reactance (Xd), the larger is Ld. It results from small air gaps in machine design (As in Turbo generators or Cylindrical rotor Machines). Machines are tightly coupled to the grid, and their response will be fast. This reduces the machine's stability while operating on the grid and will reduce the short circuit current delivery capability (lower short circuit current), smaller machine size, and lower cost subsequently. Typical values of SCR for turbo alternators may be in the range of 0.45 to 0.9.

== Sources ==
- Louis, M. Maria (2014). Elements of Electrical Engineering. Eastern economy edition. PHI Learning. ISBN 978-81-203-4852-3.
- Ehya, Hossein; Faiz, Jawad (2022). Electromagnetic Analysis and Condition Monitoring of Synchronous Generators. IEEE Press Series on Power and Energy Systems. Wiley. ISBN 978-1-119-63607-6.
- Das, J.C. (2017). Short-Circuits in AC and DC Systems: ANSI, IEEE, and IEC Standards. CRC Press. ISBN 978-1-4987-4542-0.
- Boldea, I. (2018). Electric Generators Handbook - Two Volume Set. CRC Press. ISBN 978-1-4987-2351-0.
- Ghosh, S. (2012). Electrical Machines. Pearson Education India. ISBN 978-81-317-7602-5.
- Ray, S. (2014). Electrical Power Systems: Concept, Theory and Practice. PHI Learning. ISBN 978-81-203-4951-3.
