= Charles LeGeyt Fortescue =

Canadian electrical engineer

- Born: 1876; York Factory
- Died: 1936 (aged 59–60); Pittsburgh, Pennsylvania, United States
- Education: Queen's University
- Occupation: Electrical engineer
- Years active: Since 1898
- Employer: Westinghouse Electric Corporation
- Known for: Symmetrical components
- Spouse: Louise Cameron Walter (m. 1905)
- Children: Ernest, Charles, Thomas
- Awards: Elliott Cresson Medal (1932)

Charles LeGeyt Fortescue (1876–1936) was an electrical engineer. He was born in York Factory, in what is now Manitoba where the Hayes River enters Hudson Bay. He was the son of a Hudson's Bay Company fur trading factor and was among the first graduates of the Queen's University electrical engineering program in 1898.

On graduation Fortescue joined the Westinghouse Corporation at East Pittsburgh, Pennsylvania, where he spent his entire professional career. In 1901 he joined the Transformer Engineering Department and worked on many problems arising from the use of high voltage. In 1913 Fortescue published the AIEE paper "The Application of a Theorem of Electrostatics to Insulator Problems". Also in that year he was one of the authors of a paper on measurement of high voltage by the breakdown of a gap between two conductive spheres, which is a technique still used in high-voltage laboratories today.

In a paper presented in 1918, Fortescue demonstrated that any set of N unbalanced phasors — that is, any such "polyphase" signal — could be expressed as the sum of N symmetrical sets of balanced phasors known as symmetrical components. The paper was judged to be the most important power engineering paper in the twentieth century.

He was awarded the Franklin Institute's 1932 Elliott Cresson Medal for his contributions to the field of electrical engineering.

A fellowship awarded every year by the IEEE in his name commemorates his contributions to electrical engineering.

== Patents ==
Fortescue obtained 185 patents in his career, in the design of transformers, insulators, and DC and AC power circuits.

- Insulating-body for electrical apparatus, U.S. patent 1,129,520
- Transformer and winding, U.S. patent 1,129,464
- Alternating current transformer, U.S. patent 1,129,470
- System of distribution, U.S. patent 1,351,033
