= Minimum rank of a graph =

In mathematics, the minimum rank is a graph parameter $\operatorname{mr}(G)$ for a graph G. It was motivated by the Colin de Verdière graph invariant.

== Definition ==
The adjacency matrix of an undirected graph is a symmetric matrix whose rows and columns both correspond to the vertices of the graph. Its elements are all 0 or 1, and the element in row i and column j is nonzero whenever vertex i is adjacent to vertex j in the graph. More generally, a generalized adjacency matrix is any symmetric matrix of real numbers with the same pattern of nonzeros off the diagonal (the diagonal elements may be any real numbers). The minimum rank of $G$ is defined as the smallest rank of any generalized adjacency matrix of the graph; it is denoted by $\operatorname{mr} (G)$.

== Properties ==
Here are some elementary properties.

- The minimum rank of a graph is always at most equal to n − 1, where n is the number of vertices in the graph.
- For every induced subgraph H of a given graph G, the minimum rank of H is at most equal to the minimum rank of G.
- If a graph is disconnected, then its minimum rank is the sum of the minimum ranks of its connected components.
- The minimum rank is a graph invariant: isomorphic graphs necessarily have the same minimum rank.

== Characterization of known graph families ==
Several families of graphs may be characterized in terms of their minimum ranks.

- For $n\geq 2$, the complete graph K_{n} on n vertices has minimum rank one. The only graphs that are connected and have minimum rank one are the complete graphs.
- A path graph P_{n} on n vertices has minimum rank n − 1. The only n-vertex graphs with minimum rank n − 1 are the path graphs.
- A cycle graph C_{n} on n vertices has minimum rank n − 2.
- Let $G$ be a 2-connected graph. Then $\operatorname{mr}(G)=|G|-2$ if and only if $G$ is a linear 2-tree.
- A graph $G$ has $\operatorname{mr}(G)\leq 2$ if and only if the complement of $G$ is of the form $(K_{s_1}\cup K_{s_2}\cup K_{p_1,q_1}\cup \cdots \cup K_{p_k,q_k} ) \vee K_r$ for appropriate nonnegative integers $k, s_1, s_2, p_1, q_1,\ldots , p_k, q_k, r$ with $p_i+q_i>0$ for all $i=1,\ldots, k$.
