= Open-circuit saturation curve =

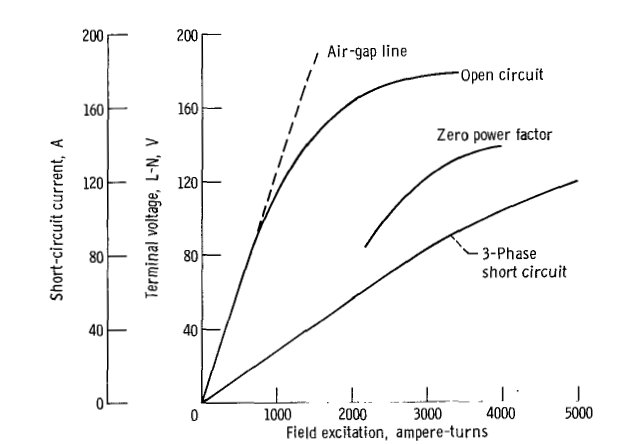
A diagram with multiple synchronous machine curves; open-circuit saturation curve is the leftmost one

The open-circuit saturation curve (also open-circuit characteristic, OCC) of a synchronous generator is a plot of the output open circuit voltage as a function of the excitation current or field. The curve is typically plotted alongside the synchronous impedance curve.

At the low field, the permeable iron in the magnetic circuit of the generator is not saturated, therefore the reluctance almost entirely depends on the fixed contribution of the air gap, so the part of the curve that starts at the point of origin is a linear "air-gap line" (output voltage is proportional to the excitation current). As the iron saturates with higher excitation and thus higher magnetic flux, the reluctance increases, and the OCC deflects down from the air-gap line.

The curve is obtained by rotating the generator at the rated RPM with the output terminals disconnected and the output voltage typically going to at least 120% of the rated voltage for the device. The hydraulic units sometimes have to be tested at lower RPM with the resulting voltage scaled up to accommodate the differences in frequency. Since the test goes above the rated voltage, the step-up transformer is typically also disconnected to avoid damaging it.

The open circuit saturation curve could be used together with the zero power factor curve in Potier Triangle Method.

== Sources ==
- Klempner, G.; Kerszenbaum, I. (2004). "Open-Circuit Saturation Characteristic". Operation and Maintenance of Large Turbo-Generators. IEEE Press Series on Power Engineering. Wiley. ISBN 978-0-471-61447-0.
- Boldea, I. (2015). Synchronous Generators. CRC Press. ISBN 978-1-4987-2355-8.
