= Synchronous impedance curve =

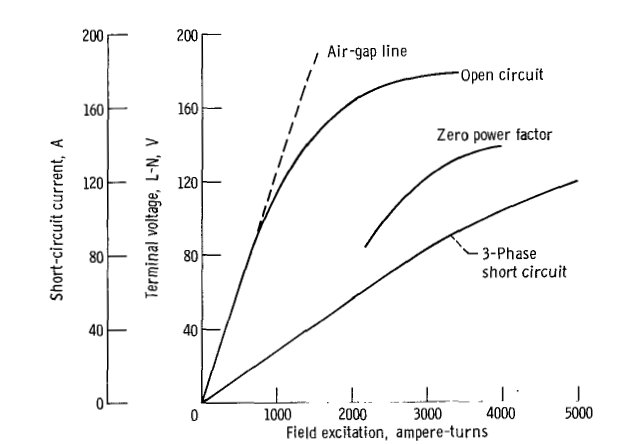
A diagram with multiple synchronous machine curves; short-circuit curve is the rightmost

The synchronous impedance curve (also short-circuit characteristic, SCC) of a synchronous generator is a plot of the output short circuit current as a function of the excitation current or field. The curve is typically plotted alongside the open-circuit saturation curve.

The SCC is almost linear, since under the short-circuit conditions the magnetic flux in the generator is below the iron saturation levels and thus the reluctance is almost entirely defined by the fixed one of the air gap. The name "synchronous impedance curve" is due to the fact that in the short-circuit condition all the generated voltage dissipates across the generator internal synchronous impedance $Z_S$.

Synchronous impedance curve (short-circuit characteristic curve), showing armature current as function of field current.

The curve is obtained by rotating the generator at the rated RPM with the output terminals shorted and the output current going to 100% of the rated for the device (higher values are typically not tested to avoid overheating).

== Sources ==
- Klempner, G.; Kerszenbaum, I. (2004). "Short-Circuit Saturation Characteristic". Operation and Maintenance of Large Turbo-Generators. IEEE Press Series on Power Engineering. Wiley. pp. 125–126. ISBN 978-0-471-61447-0.
- Boldea, I. (2015). Synchronous Generators. CRC Press. ISBN 978-1-4987-2355-8.
