= Zero power factor curve =

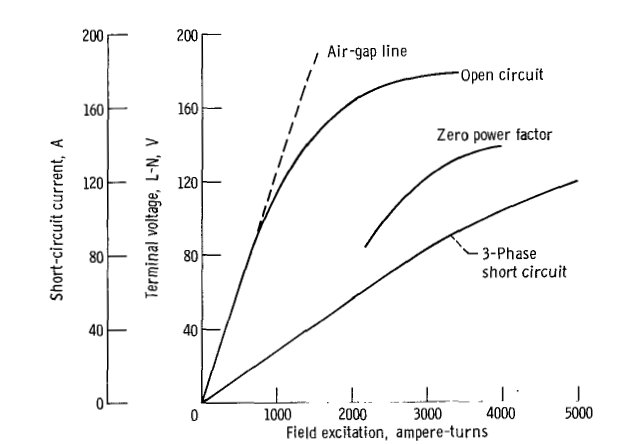
A diagram with multiple synchronous machine curves; Zero power factor curve is the middle

The zero power factor curve (also zero power factor characteristic, ZPF, ZPFC) of a synchronous generator is a plot of the output voltage as a function of the excitation current or field using a zero power factor (purely inductive) load that corresponds to rated voltage at rated current (1 p.u.). The curve is typically plotted alongside the open-circuit characteristic.

Obtained by measuring the terminal voltage when the current has a zero power factor current using a pure inductive load that could be regulated to compensate the reactive power of the generator EMF.

The curve is obtained by rotating the generator at the rated RPM with the output terminals connected to the unity load, varying the excitation field and recording the output voltage.

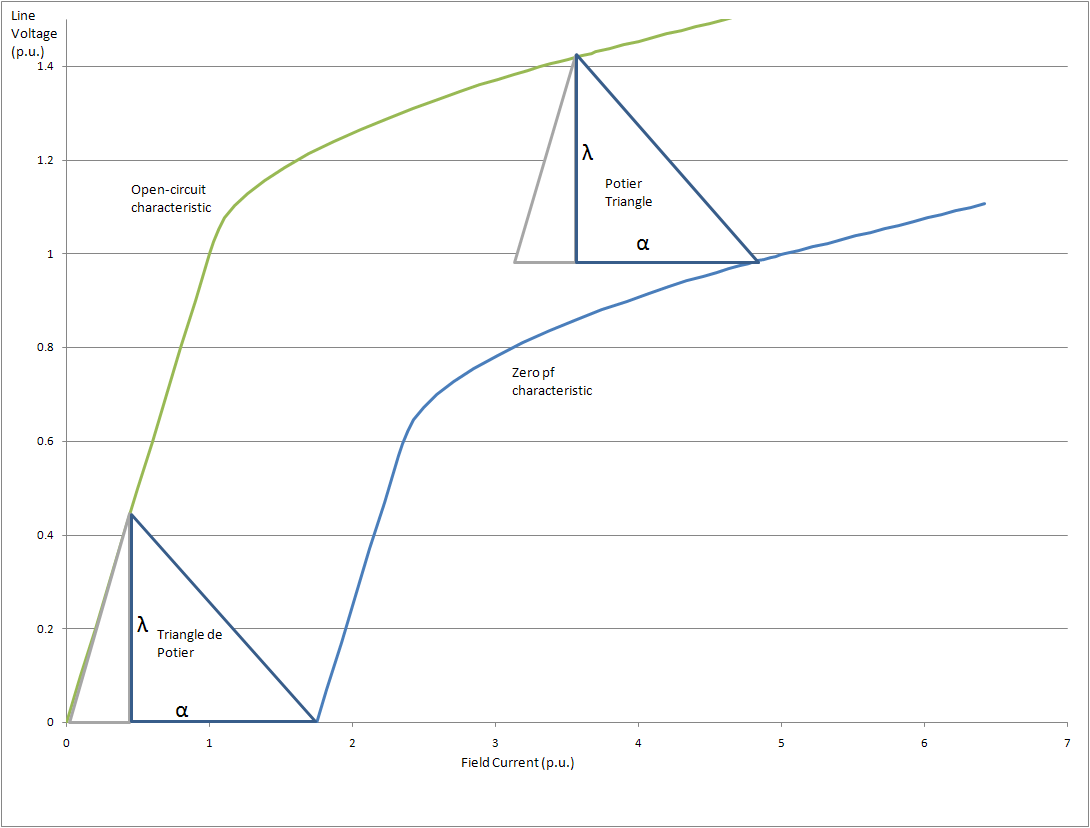
Potier Triangle

The ZPFC could be used together with the open-circuit saturation curve in Potier Triangle method.

The zero power characteristic is similar to the open-circuit characteristic but shifted down by $\alpha$.
