= Symmetrical components =

Method of analysis of unbalanced three-phase power systems

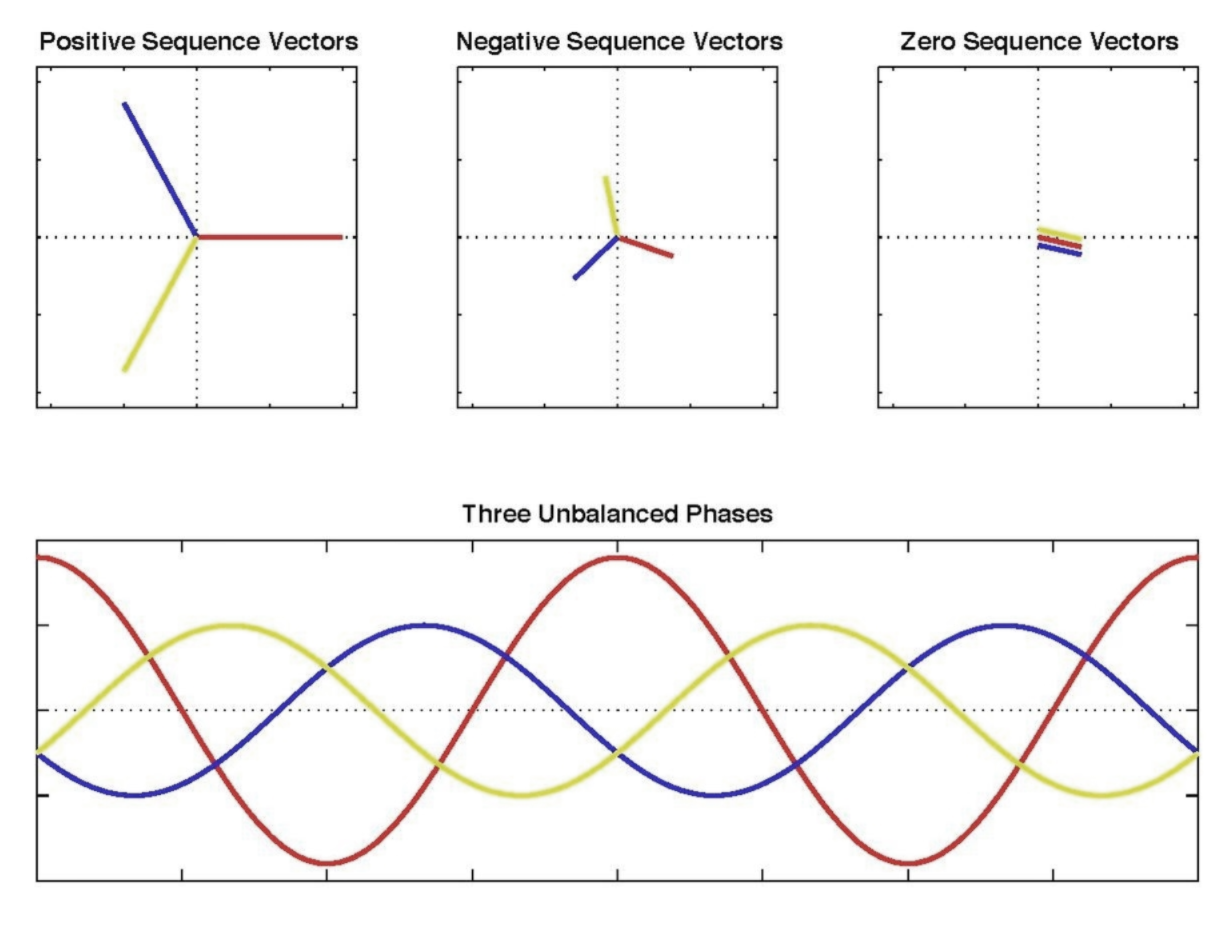
Set of three unbalanced phasors, and the necessary symmetrical components that sum up to the resulting plot at the bottom.

In electrical engineering, the method of symmetrical components simplifies the analysis of a three-phase power system exhibiting an electrical fault or other unbalanced condition.

The symmetrical components corresponding to an asymmetrical set of three phasors are:

- Sequence 0 (also known as zero sequence or homopolar) is one-third the sum of the original three phasors.
- Sequence 1 (positive sequence) is one-third the sum of the original three phasors rotated counterclockwise by 0°, 120°, and 240°.
- Sequence 2 (negative sequence) is one-third the sum of the original three phasors rotated counterclockwise 0°, 240°, and 120°.

The analysis of power systems is much simpler in the domain of symmetrical components, because the resulting equations are mutually linearly independent if the power system itself is balanced. In this case, each symmetrical component can be analyzed separately, similar to the per-phase analysis.

Protective relays utilize symmetric components for fault detection. For example, during normal operation, the zero-sequence current is very small, so a high current value is a convenient and reliable indicator of a ground fault.

== History ==
The basic idea dates back to 1895, when Ferraris et al. produced an analysis of a single-phase motor by splitting a field set inside it into two components revolving in the opposite directions. The concept now known as the positive and negative sequences was published by Ernst Alexanderson in 1913 in his work on phase balancers, and by L. G. Stokvis in 1912-1915 while investigating the voltage regulation. These works lacked the clear definition of a zero sequence.

In 1918 Charles Legeyt Fortescue presented a paper which demonstrated that any set of N unbalanced phasors (that is, any such polyphase signal) could be expressed as the sum of N symmetrical sets of balanced phasors, for values of N that are prime. Only a single frequency component is represented by the phasors.

In 1943 Edith Clarke published a textbook giving a method of use of symmetrical components for three-phase systems that greatly simplified calculations over the original Fortescue paper. In a three-phase system, one set of phasors has the same phase sequence as the system under study (positive sequence; say ABC), the second set has the reverse phase sequence (negative sequence; ACB), and in the third set the phasors A, B and C are in phase with each other (zero sequence, the common-mode signal). Essentially, this method converts three unbalanced phases into three independent sources, which makes asymmetric fault analysis more tractable.

== Description ==
By expanding a one-line diagram to show the positive sequence, negative sequence, and zero sequence impedances of generators, transformers and other devices including overhead lines and cables, analysis of such unbalanced conditions as a single line to ground short-circuit fault is greatly simplified. The technique can also be extended to higher order phase systems.

Physically, in a three phase system, a positive sequence set of currents produces a normal rotating field, a negative sequence set produces a field with the opposite rotation, and the zero sequence set produces a field that oscillates but does not rotate between phase windings. Since these effects can be detected physically with sequence filters, the mathematical tool became the basis for the design of protective relays, which used negative-sequence voltages and currents as a reliable indicator of fault conditions. Such relays may be used to trip circuit breakers or take other steps to protect electrical systems.

The analytical technique was adopted and advanced by engineers at General Electric and Westinghouse, and after World War II it became an accepted method for asymmetric fault analysis.

As shown in the figure to the above right, the three sets of symmetrical components (positive, negative, and zero sequence) add up to create the system of three unbalanced phases as pictured in the bottom of the diagram. The imbalance between phases arises because of the difference in magnitude and phase shift between the sets of vectors. Notice that the colors (red, blue, and yellow) of the separate sequence vectors correspond to three different phases (A, B, and C, for example). To arrive at the final plot, the sum of vectors of each phase is calculated. This resulting vector is the effective phasor representation of that particular phase. This process, repeated, produces the phasor for each of the three phases.

== The three-phase case ==
Symmetrical components are most commonly used for analysis of three-phase electrical power systems. The voltage or current of a three-phase system at some point can be indicated by three phasors, called the three components of the voltage or the current.

This article discusses voltage; however, the same considerations also apply to current. In a perfectly balanced three-phase power system, the voltage phasor components have equal magnitudes but are 120 degrees apart. In an unbalanced system, the magnitudes and phases of the voltage phasor components are different.

Decomposing the voltage phasor components into a set of symmetrical components helps analyze the system as well as visualize any imbalances. If the three voltage components are expressed as phasors (which are complex numbers), a complex vector can be formed in which the three phase components are the components of the vector. A vector for three phase voltage components can be written as

$$\mathbf{v}_{abc} = \begin{bmatrix} V_a \\ V_b \\ V_c \end{bmatrix}$$

and decomposing the vector into three symmetrical components gives

$$\begin{bmatrix} V_a \\ V_b \\ V_c \end{bmatrix} =
\begin{bmatrix} V_{a,0} \\ V_{b,0} \\ V_{c,0} \end{bmatrix} + \begin{bmatrix} V_{a,1} \\ V_{b,1} \\ V_{c,1} \end{bmatrix} + \begin{bmatrix} V_{a,2} \\ V_{b,2} \\ V_{c,2} \end{bmatrix}$$

where the subscripts 0, 1, and 2 refer respectively to the zero, positive, and negative sequence components (NSC). The sequence components differ only by their phase angles, which are symmetrical and so are $\scriptstyle\frac{2}{3}\pi$ radians or 120°.

=== A matrix ===
Define a phasor rotation operator $\alpha$, which rotates a phasor vector counterclockwise by 120 degrees when multiplied by it:

$$\alpha \equiv e^{\frac{2}{3}\pi i}$$.

Note that $\alpha^3 = 1$ so that $\alpha^{-1} = \alpha^2$.

The zero sequence components have equal magnitude and are in phase with each other, therefore:

$$V_0 \equiv V_{a,0} = V_{b,0} = V_{c,0}$$,

and the other sequence components have the same magnitude, but their phase angles differ by 120°. If the original unbalanced set of voltage phasors have positive or abc phase sequence, then:

$$\begin{align}
V_1 &\equiv V_{a,1} = \alpha V_{b,1} = \alpha^2 V_{c,1}
\end{align}$$,
$$\begin{align}
V_2 &\equiv V_{a,2} = \alpha^2 V_{b,2} = \alpha V_{c,2}
\end{align}$$,

meaning that

$$\begin{align} V_{b,1} = \alpha^2 V_1\end{align}$$,
$$\begin{align} V_{c,1} = \alpha V_1\end{align}$$,
$$\begin{align} V_{b,2} = \alpha V_2\end{align}$$,
$$\begin{align} V_{c,2} = \alpha^2 V_2\end{align}$$.

Thus,

$$\begin{align}
\mathbf{v}_{abc}
&= \begin{bmatrix} V_0 \\ V_0 \\ V_0 \end{bmatrix} +
\begin{bmatrix} V_1 \\ \alpha^2 V_1 \\ \alpha V_1 \end{bmatrix} +
\begin{bmatrix} V_2 \\ \alpha V_2 \\ \alpha^2 V_2 \end{bmatrix} \\
&= \begin{bmatrix}1 & 1 & 1 \\ 1 & \alpha^2 & \alpha \\ 1 & \alpha & \alpha^2 \end{bmatrix}
\begin{bmatrix} V_0 \\ V_1 \\ V_2 \end{bmatrix} \\
&= \textbf{A} \mathbf{v}_{012}
\end{align}$$

where

$$\mathbf{v}_{012} = \begin{bmatrix} V_0 \\ V_1 \\ V_2 \end{bmatrix}, \textbf{A} = \begin{bmatrix}1 & 1 & 1 \\ 1 & \alpha^2 & \alpha \\ 1 & \alpha & \alpha^2 \end{bmatrix}$$

If instead the original unbalanced set of voltage phasors have negative or acb phase sequence, the following matrix can be similarly derived:

$$\textbf{A}_{acb} = \begin{bmatrix}1 & 1 & 1 \\ 1 & \alpha & \alpha^2 \\ 1 & \alpha^2 & \alpha \end{bmatrix}$$

=== Decomposition ===
The sequence components are derived from the analysis equation

$$\mathbf{v}_{012} = \textbf{A}^{-1} \mathbf{v}_{abc}$$

where

$$\textbf{A}^{-1} = \frac{1}{3} \begin{bmatrix}1 & 1 & 1 \\ 1 & \alpha & \alpha^2 \\ 1 & \alpha^2 & \alpha \end{bmatrix}$$

The above two equations tell how to derive symmetrical components corresponding to an asymmetrical set of three phasors:

- Sequence 0 is one-third the sum of the original three phasors.
- Sequence 1 is one-third the sum of the original three phasors rotated counterclockwise 0°, 120°, and 240°.
- Sequence 2 is one-third the sum of the original three phasors rotated counterclockwise 0°, 240°, and 120°.

Visually, if the original components are symmetrical, sequences 0 and 2 will each form a triangle, summing to zero, and sequence 1 components will sum to a straight line.

=== Intuition ===
Napoleon's theorem: If the triangles centered on L, M, and N are equilateral, then so is the green triangle.

The phasors $\scriptstyle V_{(ab)}= V_{(a)}-V_{(b)}; \;V_{(bc)}= V_{(b)}-V_{(c)}; \; V_{(ca)}= V_{(c)}-V_{(a)}$ form a closed triangle (e.g., outer voltages or line to line voltages). To find the synchronous and inverse components of the phases, take any side of the outer triangle and draw the two possible equilateral triangles sharing the selected side as base. These two equilateral triangles represent a synchronous and an inverse system.

If the phasors V were a perfectly synchronous system, the vertex of the outer triangle not on the base line would be at the same position as the corresponding vertex of the equilateral triangle representing the synchronous system. Any amount of inverse component would mean a deviation from this position. The deviation is exactly 3 times the inverse phase component.

The synchronous component is in the same manner 3 times the deviation from the "inverse equilateral triangle". The directions of these components are correct for the relevant phase. It seems counter intuitive that this works for all three phases regardless of the side chosen but that is the beauty of this illustration. The graphic is from Napoleon's Theorem, which matches a graphical calculation technique that sometimes appears in older references books.

== Poly-phase case ==
The idea can be expanded to N phases: an asymmetrical set of N phasors can be expressed as a linear combination of N symmetrical sets of phasors by means of a complex linear transformation. Fortescue's theorem (symmetrical components) is based on the superposition principle, so it is applicable to linear power systems only, or to linear approximations of non-linear power systems.

It can be seen that the transformation matrix A above is a DFT matrix, and as such, symmetrical components can be calculated for any poly-phase system.

== Contribution of harmonics to symmetrical components in 3-phase power systems ==
Harmonics often occur in power systems as a consequence of non-linear loads. Each order of harmonics contributes to different sequence components. The fundamental and harmonics of order $\scriptstyle 3n + 1$ will contribute to the positive sequence component. Harmonics of order $\scriptstyle 3n - 1$ will contribute to the negative sequence. Harmonics of order $\scriptstyle 3n$ contribute to the zero sequence.

Note that the rules above are only applicable if the phase values (or distortion) in each phase are exactly the same. Please further note that even harmonics are not common in power systems.

== Consequence of the zero sequence component in power systems ==
The zero sequence represents the component of the unbalanced phasors that is equal in magnitude and phase. Because they are in phase, zero sequence currents flowing through an n-phase network will sum to n times the magnitude of the individual zero sequence currents components. Under normal operating conditions this sum is small enough to be negligible. However, during large zero sequence events such as lightning strikes, this nonzero sum of currents can lead to a larger current flowing through the neutral conductor than the individual phase conductors. Because neutral conductors are typically not larger than individual phase conductors, and are often smaller than these conductors, a large zero sequence component can lead to overheating of neutral conductors and to fires.

One way to prevent large zero sequence currents is to use a delta connection, which appears as an open circuit to zero sequence currents. For this reason, most transmission, and much sub-transmission is implemented using delta. Much distribution is also implemented using delta, although "old work" distribution systems have occasionally been "wyed-up" (converted from delta to wye) so as to increase the line's capacity at a low converted cost, but at the expense of a higher central station protective relay cost.

== See also ==
- Symmetry
- Direct-quadrature-zero transformation
- Alpha–beta transformation
