= Robert H. Park =

American electrical engineer and inventor (1902–1994)

- Born: March 15, 1902; Strasbourg
- Died: February 18, 1994 (aged 91)
- Known for: Park's transformation
- Awards: IEEE Lamme Medal (1945); Navy Distinguished Civilian Service Award(1972)

Robert H. Park (March __, 1902 – February 18, 1994) was an American electrical engineer and inventor, best known for the Park's transformation, used for simplifying the analysis of three-phase electric circuits. His related 1929 concept paper ranked second, when looking at the impact of all twentieth century power engineering papers. Park was an IEEE Fellow and a member of the National Academy of Engineering.

Park was born on March 15, 1902, in Strasbourg, when his father urban sociologist Robert E. Park was studying in Germany. Back in the United States Park lived in Wollaston, Massachusetts and earned in 1923 a degree in electrical engineering at the Massachusetts Institute of Technology. After this he went to the Royal Institute of Technology in Stockholm, Sweden to improve his knowledge on operational calculus.

Park started working for General Electric, where he created his 1929 Park's transformation paper, followed by Stone and Webster Engineering in Boston as an electrical engineer and for American Cyanamid as a chemical engineer doing physics research. During World War II he was involved in mine development at the Naval Ordnance Laboratory, resulting in 17 United States patents. After the war he became Director of Research Development and Engineering at the Emhart Manufacturing Company (1946), started working as independent consultant and manufacturer in automation (1953), and was president of Fast Load Control, Inc. active in power systems stability (1968). At the end, Park was able to generate 64 U.S. patents in a broad area of disciplines.

Park received several awards and honors, which include the Navy Distinguished Civilian Service Award (1945), the election to IEEE Fellow (1965), the IEEE Lamme Medal (1972), “In recognition of his outstanding contributions to analysis of the transient behavior of a-c machines and systems,” and the election to member of the National Academy of Engineering (1986).
