= Star-mesh transform =

Mathematical circuit analysis technique

The star-mesh transform, or star-polygon transform, is a mathematical circuit analysis technique to transform a resistive network into an equivalent network with one less node. The equivalence follows from the Schur complement identity applied to the Kirchhoff matrix of the network.

The equivalent impedance betweens nodes A and B is given by:

$$z_\text{AB} = z_\text{A} z_\text{B} \sum\frac{1}{z},$$

where $z_\text{A}$ is the impedance between node A and the central node being removed.

The transform replaces N resistors with $\frac{1}{2}N(N - 1)$ resistors. For $N > 3$, the result is an increase in the number of resistors, so the transform has no general inverse without additional constraints.

It is possible, though not necessarily efficient, to transform an arbitrarily complex two-terminal resistive network into a single equivalent resistor by repeatedly applying the star-mesh transform to eliminate each non-terminal node.

== Special cases ==
When N is:

1. For a single dangling resistor, the transform eliminates the resistor.
2. For two resistors, the "star" is simply the two resistors in series, and the transform yields a single equivalent resistor.
3. The special case of three resistors is better known as the Y-Δ transform. Since the result also has three resistors, this transform has an inverse Δ-Y transform.

== See also ==
- Kron reduction
- Topology of electrical circuits
- Network analysis (electrical circuits)
