= Y-Δ transform =

Technique in electrical circuit analysis

In circuit design, the Y-Δ transform, also written wye-delta and also known by many other names, is a mathematical technique to simplify the analysis of an electrical network. The name derives from the shapes of the circuit diagrams, which look respectively like the letter Y and the Greek capital letter Δ. This circuit transformation theory was published by Arthur Edwin Kennelly in 1899. It is widely used in analysis of three-phase electric power circuits.

The Y-Δ transform can be considered a special case of the star-mesh transform for three resistors. In mathematics, the Y-Δ transform plays an important role in theory of circular planar graphs.

== Names ==
Illustration of the transform in its T-Π representation.

The Y-Δ transform is known by a variety of other names, mostly based upon the two shapes involved, listed in either order. The Y, spelled out as wye, can also be called T or star; the Δ, spelled out as delta, can also be called triangle, Π (spelled out as pi), or mesh. Thus, common names for the transformation include wye-delta or delta-wye, star-delta, star-mesh, or T-Π.

== Basic Y-Δ transformation ==
Δ and Y circuits with the labels which are used in this article.

The transformation is used to establish equivalence for networks with three terminals. Where three elements terminate at a common node and none are sources, the node is eliminated by transforming the impedances. For equivalence, the impedance between any pair of terminals must be the same for both networks. The equations given here are valid for complex as well as real impedances. Complex impedance is a quantity measured in ohms which represents resistance as positive real numbers in the usual manner, and also represents reactance as positive and negative imaginary values.

=== Equations for the transformation from Δ to Y ===
The general idea is to compute the impedance $R_\text{Y}$ at a terminal node of the Y circuit with impedances $R'$, $R''$ to adjacent nodes in the Δ circuit by

$$R_\text{Y} = \frac{R'R''}{\sum R_\Delta}$$

where $R_\Delta$ are all impedances in the Δ circuit. This yields the specific formula

$$\begin{align}
R_1 &= \frac{R_\text{b}R_\text{c}}{R_\text{a} + R_\text{b} + R_\text{c}} \\[3pt]
R_2 &= \frac{R_\text{a}R_\text{c}}{R_\text{a} + R_\text{b} + R_\text{c}} \\[3pt]
R_3 &= \frac{R_\text{a}R_\text{b}}{R_\text{a} + R_\text{b} + R_\text{c}}
\end{align}$$

=== Equations for the transformation from Y to Δ ===
The general idea is to compute an impedance $R_\Delta$ in the Δ circuit by

$$R_\Delta = \frac{R_P}{R_\text{opposite}}$$

where $R_P = R_1 R_2 + R_2 R_3 + R_3 R_1$ is the sum of the products of all pairs of impedances in the Y circuit and $R_\text{opposite}$ is the impedance of the node in the Y circuit which is opposite the edge with $R_\Delta$. The formulae for the individual edges are thus

$$\begin{align}
R_\text{a} &= \frac{R_1 R_2 + R_2 R_3 + R_3 R_1}{R_1} = R_2+R_3+\frac{R_2R_3}{R_1} \\[3pt]
R_\text{b} &= \frac{R_1 R_2 + R_2 R_3 + R_3 R_1}{R_2} = R_1+R_3+\frac{R_1R_3}{R_2} \\[3pt]
R_\text{c} &= \frac{R_1 R_2 + R_2 R_3 + R_3 R_1}{R_3} = R_1+R_2+\frac{R_1R_2}{R_3}
\end{align}$$

Or, if using admittance instead of resistance:

$$\begin{align}
Y_\text{a} &= \frac{Y_3 Y_2}{\sum Y_\text{Y}} \\[3pt]
Y_\text{b} &= \frac{Y_3 Y_1}{\sum Y_\text{Y}} \\[3pt]
Y_\text{c} &= \frac{Y_1 Y_2}{\sum Y_\text{Y}}
\end{align}$$

Note that the general formula in Y to Δ using admittance is similar to Δ to Y using resistance.

== A proof of the existence and uniqueness of the transformation ==
The feasibility of the transformation can be shown as a consequence of the superposition theorem for electric circuits. A short proof, rather than one derived as a corollary of the more general star-mesh transform, can be given as follows. The equivalence lies in the statement that for any external voltages ($V_1, V_2$ and $V_3$) applying at the three nodes ($N_1, N_2$ and $N_3$), the corresponding currents ($I_1, I_2$ and $I_3$) are exactly the same for both the Y and Δ circuit, and vice versa. In this proof, we start with given external currents at the nodes. According to the superposition theorem, the voltages can be obtained by studying the superposition of the resulting voltages at the nodes of the following three problems applied at the three nodes with current:

1. $\frac{1}{3}\left(I_1 - I_2\right), -\frac{1}{3}\left(I_1 - I_2\right), 0$
2. $0,\frac{1}{3}\left(I_2 - I_3\right), -\frac{1}{3}\left(I_2 - I_3\right)$ and
3. $-\frac{1}{3}\left(I_3 - I_1\right), 0, \frac{1}{3}\left(I_3 - I_1\right)$

The equivalence can be readily shown by using Kirchhoff's circuit laws that $I_1 + I_2 + I_3 = 0$. Now each problem is relatively simple, since it involves only one single ideal current source. To obtain exactly the same outcome voltages at the nodes for each problem, the equivalent resistances in the two circuits must be the same, this can be easily found by using the basic rules of series and parallel circuits:

$$R_3 + R_1 = \frac{\left(R_\text{c} + R_\text{a}\right)R_\text{b}}{R_\text{a} + R_\text{b} + R_\text{c}},\quad
\frac{R_3}{R_1} = \frac{R_\text{a}}{R_\text{c}}.$$

Though usually six equations are more than enough to express three variables ($R_1, R_2, R_3$) in term of the other three variables($R_\text{a}, R_\text{b}, R_\text{c}$), here it is straightforward to show that these equations indeed lead to the above designed expressions.

In fact, the superposition theorem establishes the relation between the values of the resistances, the uniqueness theorem guarantees the uniqueness of such solution.

== Simplification of networks ==
Resistive networks between two terminals can theoretically be simplified to a single equivalent resistor (more generally, the same is true of impedance). Series and parallel transforms are basic tools for doing so, but for complex networks such as the bridge illustrated here, they do not suffice.

The Y-Δ transform can be used to eliminate one node at a time and produce a network that can be further simplified, as shown.

Transformation of a bridge resistor network, using the Y-Δ transform to eliminate node D, yields an equivalent network that may readily be simplified further.

The reverse transformation, Δ-Y, which adds a node, is often handy to pave the way for further simplification as well.

Transformation of a bridge resistor network, using the Δ-Y transform, also yields an equivalent network that may readily be simplified further.

Every two-terminal network represented by a planar graph can be reduced to a single equivalent resistor by a sequence of series, parallel, Y-Δ, and Δ-Y transformations. However, there are non-planar networks that cannot be simplified using these transformations, such as a regular square grid wrapped around a torus, or any member of the Petersen family.

== Graph theory ==
In graph theory, the Y-Δ transform means replacing a Y subgraph of a graph with the equivalent Δ subgraph. The transform preserves the number of edges in a graph, but not the number of vertices or the number of cycles. Two graphs are said to be Y-Δ equivalent if one can be obtained from the other by a series of Y-Δ transforms in either direction. For example, the Petersen family is a Y-Δ equivalence class.

== Demonstration ==
=== Δ-load to Y-load transformation equations ===
Δ and Y circuits with the labels that are used in this article.

To relate $\left\{R_\text{a}, R_\text{b}, R_\text{c}\right\}$ from Δ to $\left\{R_1, R_2, R_3\right\}$ from Y, the impedance between two corresponding nodes is compared. The impedance in either configuration is determined as if one of the nodes is disconnected from the circuit.

The impedance between N_{1} and N_{2} with N_{3} disconnected in Δ:

$$\begin{align}
R_\Delta\left(N_1, N_2\right)
&= R_\text{c} \parallel (R_\text{a} + R_\text{b}) \\[3pt]
&= \frac{1}{\frac{1}{R_\text{c}} + \frac{1}{R_\text{a} + R_\text{b}}} \\[3pt]
&= \frac{R_\text{c}\left(R_\text{a} + R_\text{b}\right)}{R_\text{a} + R_\text{b} + R_\text{c}}
\end{align}$$

To simplify, let $R_\text{T}$ be the sum of $\left\{R_\text{a}, R_\text{b}, R_\text{c}\right\}$.

$$R_\text{T} = R_\text{a} + R_\text{b} + R_\text{c}$$

Thus,

$$R_\Delta\left(N_1, N_2\right) = \frac{R_\text{c}(R_\text{a} + R_\text{b})}{R_\text{T}}$$

The corresponding impedance between N_{1} and N_{2} in Y is simple:

$$R_\text{Y}\left(N_1, N_2\right) = R_1 + R_2$$

hence:

$R_1 + R_2 = \frac{R_\text{c}(R_\text{a} + R_\text{b})}{R_\text{T}}$ (1)

Repeating for $R(N_2,N_3)$:

$R_2 + R_3 = \frac{R_\text{a}(R_\text{b} + R_\text{c})}{R_\text{T}}$ (2)

and for $R\left(N_1, N_3\right)$:

$R_1 + R_3 = \frac{R_\text{b}\left(R_\text{a} + R_\text{c}\right)}{R_\text{T}}.$ (3)

From here, the values of $\left\{R_1, R_2, R_3\right\}$ can be determined by linear combination (addition and/or subtraction).

For example, adding (1) and (3), then subtracting (2) yields

$$\begin{align}
R_1 + R_2 + R_1 + R_3 - R_2 - R_3 &=
\frac{R_\text{c}(R_\text{a} + R_\text{b})}{R_\text{T}} +
\frac{R_\text{b}(R_\text{a} + R_\text{c})}{R_\text{T}} -
\frac{R_\text{a}(R_\text{b} + R_\text{c})}{R_\text{T}} \\[3pt]
{}\Rightarrow 2R_1 &=
\frac{2R_\text{b}R_\text{c}}{R_\text{T}} \\[3pt]
{}\Rightarrow R_1 &=
\frac{R_\text{b}R_\text{c}}{R_\text{T}}.
\end{align}$$

For completeness:

$R_1 = \frac{R_\text{b}R_\text{c}}{R_\text{T}}$ (4)
$R_2 = \frac{R_\text{a}R_\text{c}}{R_\text{T}}$ (5)
$R_3 = \frac{R_\text{a}R_\text{b}}{R_\text{T}}$ (6)

=== Y-load to Δ-load transformation equations ===
Let

$$R_\text{T} = R_\text{a} + R_\text{b} + R_\text{c}$$.

We can write the Δ to Y equations as

$R_1 = \frac{R_\text{b}R_\text{c}}{R_\text{T}}$ (1)
$R_2 = \frac{R_\text{a}R_\text{c}}{R_\text{T}}$ (2)
$R_3 = \frac{R_\text{a}R_\text{b}}{R_\text{T}}.$ (3)

Multiplying the pairs of equations yields

$R_1 R_2 = \frac{R_\text{a}R_\text{b}R_\text{c}^2 }{R_\text{T}^2}$ (4)
$R_1 R_3 = \frac{R_\text{a}R_\text{b}^2 R_\text{c}}{R_\text{T}^2}$ (5)
$R_2 R_3 = \frac{R_\text{a}^2 R_\text{b}R_\text{c}}{R_\text{T}^2}$ (6)

and the sum of these equations is

$R_1 R_2 + R_1 R_3 + R_2 R_3 = \frac{ R_\text{a}R_\text{b}R_\text{c}^2 + R_\text{a}R_\text{b}^2R_\text{c} + R_\text{a}^2R_\text{b}R_\text{c}} {R_\text{T}^2}$ (7)

Factor $R_\text{a}R_\text{b}R_\text{c}$ from the right side, leaving $R_\text{T}$ in the numerator, canceling with an $R_\text{T}$ in the denominator.

$$\begin{align}
R_1 R_2 + R_1 R_3 + R_2 R_3
&={} \frac{
\left(R_\text{a}R_\text{b}R_\text{c}\right)
\left(R_\text{a} + R_\text{b} + R_\text{c}\right)
}{R_\text{T}^2} \\
&={} \frac{R_\text{a}R_\text{b}R_\text{c}}{R_\text{T}}
\end{align}$$
(8)

Note the similarity between (8) and {(1), (2), (3)}

Divide (8) by (1)

$$\begin{align}
\frac{R_1 R_2 + R_1 R_3 + R_2 R_3}{R_1}
&={} \frac{R_\text{a}R_\text{b}R_\text{c}}{R_\text{T}} \frac{R_\text{T}}{R_\text{b}R_\text{c}} \\
&={} R_\text{a},
\end{align}$$

which is the equation for $R_\text{a}$. Dividing (8) by (2) or (3) (expressions for $R_2$ or $R_3$) gives the remaining equations.

== Δ to Y transformation of a practical generator ==
During the analysis of balanced three-phase power systems, usually an equivalent per-phase (or single-phase) circuit is analyzed instead due to its simplicity. For that, equivalent wye connections are used for generators, transformers, loads and motors. The stator windings of a practical delta-connected three-phase generator, shown in the following figure, can be converted to an equivalent wye-connected generator, using the six following formulas (Note: For a demonstration, read the Talk page.):

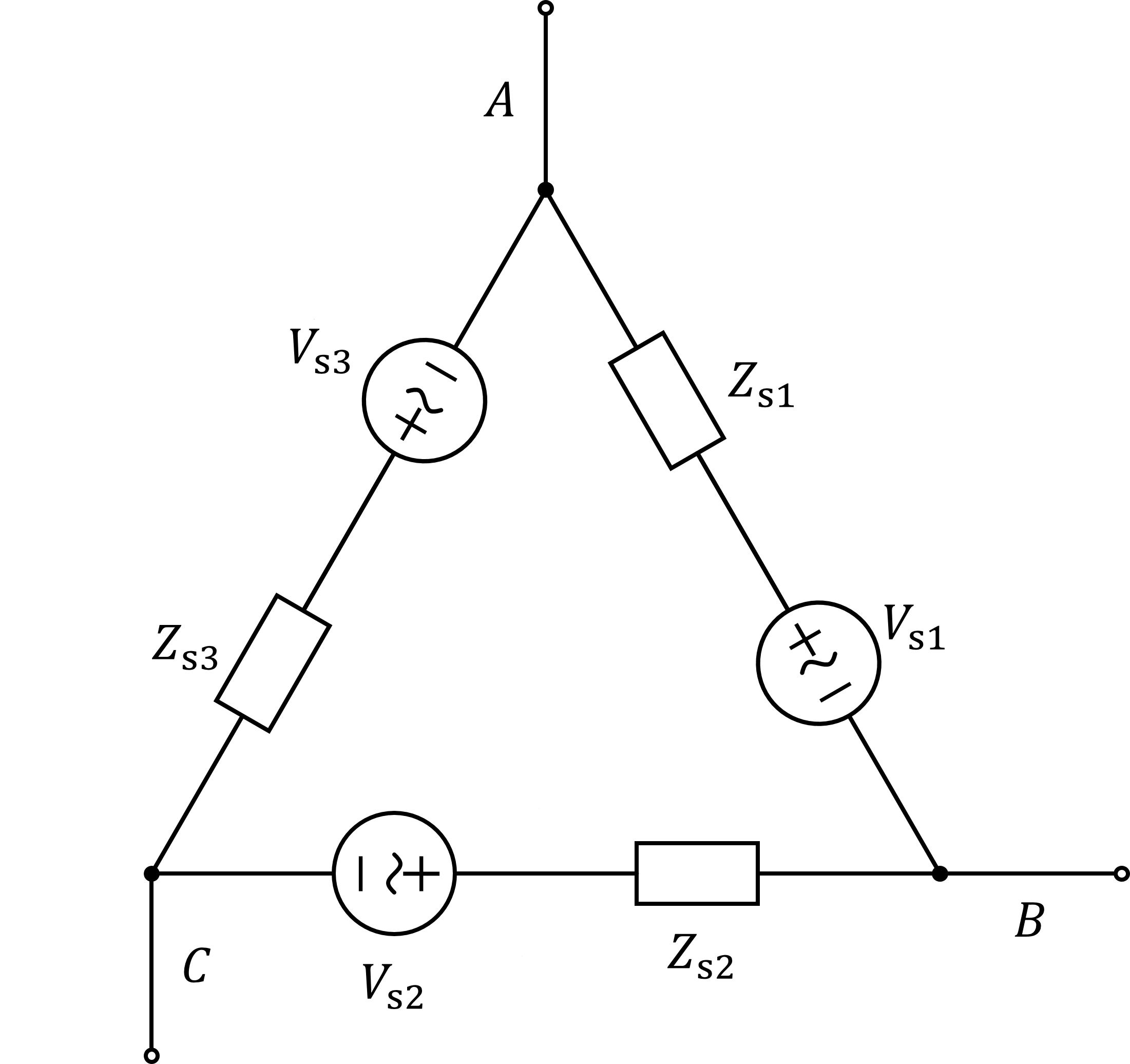
Practical generator connected in delta/triangle/pi. The quantities shown are phasor voltages and complex impedances. Click on image to expand it.

$$\begin{align}
& Z_\text{s1Y} = \dfrac{Z_\text{s1} \, Z_\text{s3}}{Z_\text{s1} + Z_\text{s2} + Z_\text{s3}} \\[2ex]
& Z_\text{s2Y} = \dfrac{Z_\text{s1} \, Z_\text{s2}}{Z_\text{s1} + Z_\text{s2} + Z_\text{s3}} \\[2ex]
& Z_\text{s3Y} = \dfrac{Z_\text{s2} \, Z_\text{s3}}{Z_\text{s1} + Z_\text{s2} + Z_\text{s3}} \\[2ex]
& V_\text{s1Y} = \left( \dfrac{V_\text{s1}}{Z_\text{s1}} - \dfrac{V_\text{s3}}{Z_\text{s3}} \right) Z_\text{s1Y} \\[2ex]
& V_\text{s2Y} = \left( \dfrac{V_\text{s2}}{Z_\text{s2}} - \dfrac{V_\text{s1}}{Z_\text{s1}} \right) Z_\text{s2Y} \\[2ex]
& V_\text{s3Y} = \left( \dfrac{V_\text{s3}}{Z_\text{s3}} - \dfrac{V_\text{s2}}{Z_\text{s2}} \right) Z_\text{s3Y}
\end{align}$$

The resulting network is the following. The neutral node of the equivalent network is fictitious, and so are the line-to-neutral phasor voltages. During the transformation, the line phasor currents and the line (or line-to-line or phase-to-phase) phasor voltages are not altered.

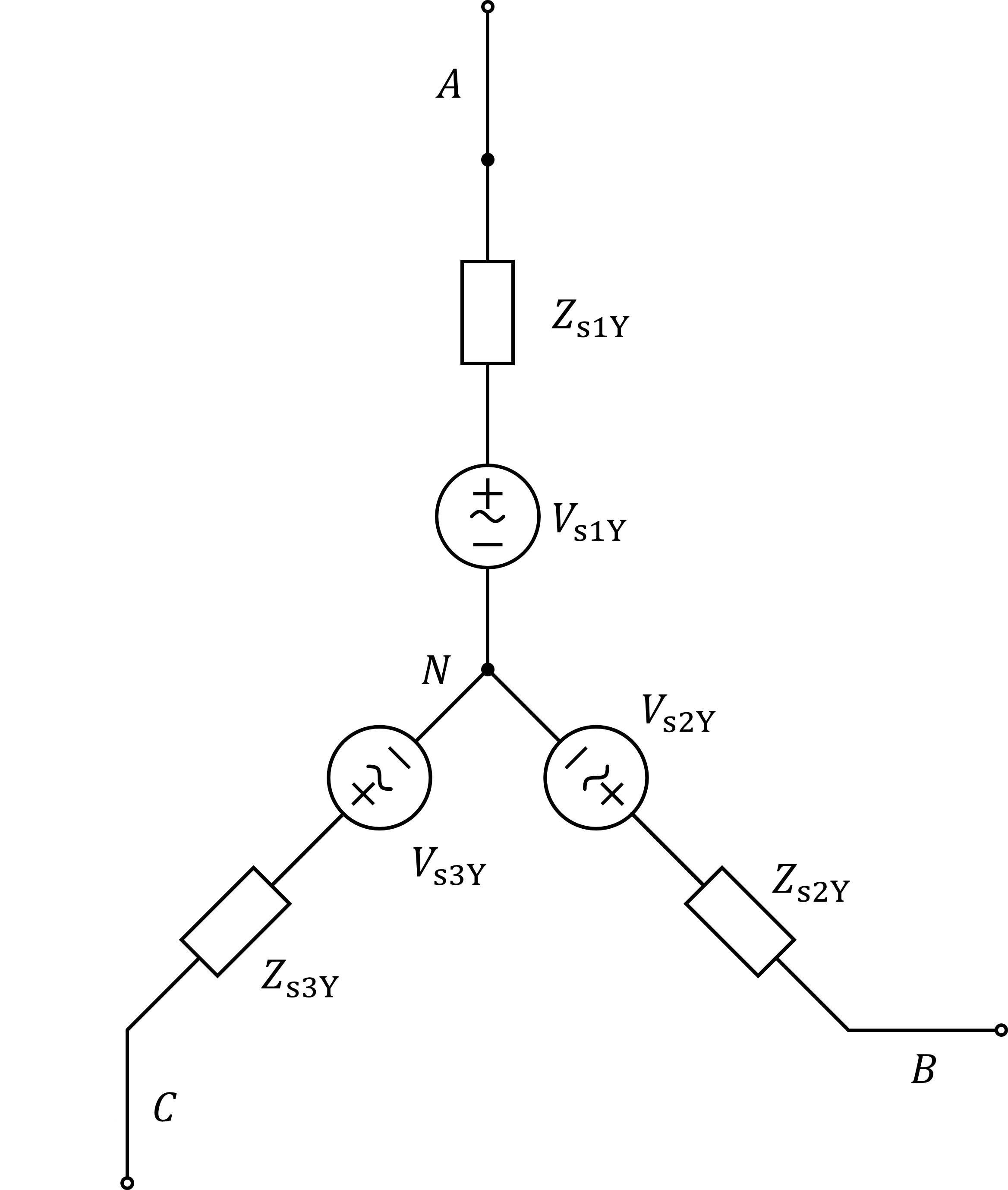
Equivalent practical generator connected in wye/star/tee. Click on image to expand it.

If the actual delta generator is balanced, meaning that the internal phasor voltages have the same magnitude and are phase-shifted by 120° between each other and the three complex impedances are the same, then the previous formulas reduce to the four following:

$$\begin{align}
& Z_\text{sY} = \dfrac{Z_\text{s}}{3}\\
& V_\text{s1Y} = \dfrac{V_\text{s1}}{\sqrt{3} \, \angle \pm 30^\circ} \\[2ex]
& V_\text{s2Y} = \dfrac{V_\text{s2}}{\sqrt{3} \, \angle \pm 30^\circ} \\[2ex]
& V_\text{s3Y} = \dfrac{V_\text{s3}}{\sqrt{3} \, \angle \pm 30^\circ}
\end{align}$$

where for the last three equations, the first sign (+) is used if the phase sequence is positive/abc or the second sign (−) is used if the phase sequence is negative/acb.

== See also ==
- Star-mesh transform
- Network analysis (electrical circuits)
- Electrical network, three-phase power, polyphase systems for examples of Y and Δ connections
- AC motor for a discussion of the Y-Δ starting technique

== Bibliography ==
- William Stevenson, Elements of Power System Analysis 3rd ed., McGraw Hill, New York, 1975, ISBN 0-07-061285-4
