= Edith Clarke =

American electrical engineer and professor (1883–1959)

- Born: February 10, 1883; Howard County, Maryland
- Died: October 29, 1959 (aged 76)
- Other name: Smart Grid's 'Founding Mother'
- Education: Vassar College (BS Mathematics 1908), Massachusetts Institute of Technology (MS Electrical Engineering 1919)
- Occupations: Electrical Engineer, Academic
- Known for: Circuit Analysis of A-C Power Systems (1943 textbook)
- Engineering career
- Discipline: Power engineering
- Employers: General Electric, University of Texas at Austin
- Significant design: Clarke transformation, Clarke calculator (1925 patent)
- Significant advance: Electrical power system analysis
- Awards: Society of Women Engineers' Achievement Award, National Inventors Hall of Fame

Edith Clarke (February 10, 1883 – October 29, 1959) was an American electrical engineer and academic. Clarke specialized in electrical power system analysis and is credited with laying the foundation for the smart grid - helping the electric grid of the future grow, remain stable and reliable. She was the first person who used an analyzer to obtain data about power networks. The U.S. Department of Energy calls her efforts “the first step toward smart grid technology. She could be called the Smart Grid’s ‘Founding Mother.’”. She wrote the textbook used by power engineers for decades titled Circuit Analysis of A-C Power Systems.

Clarke's legacy includes being the first woman to be professionally employed as an electrical engineer in the United States and the first female professor of electrical engineering in the country. She was the first woman to deliver a paper at the American Institute of Electrical Engineers.

== Early life and education ==
One of nine children, Edith Clarke was born in Howard County, Maryland to lawyer John Ridgely Clarke and Susan Dorsey Owings on February 10, 1883. After being orphaned at age 12, she was raised by an older sister. She used her inheritance to study mathematics and astronomy at Vassar College, where she graduated in 1908 with honors (Phi Beta Kappa).

After college, Clarke taught mathematics and physics at a private school in San Francisco and at Marshall College. She then spent the 1911-1912 academic year studying civil engineering at the University of Wisconsin–Madison, but left to become a "computer" at AT&T in 1912. She computed for George Campbell, who applied mathematical methods to the problems of long-distance electrical transmissions. While at AT&T, she studied electrical engineering at Columbia University at night.

In 1918, Clarke enrolled at the Massachusetts Institute of Technology, and the following year she became the first woman to earn an M.S. in electrical engineering from MIT. Her thesis at MIT was supervised by Arthur E. Kennelly and was titled "Behavior of a lumpy artificial transmission line as the frequency is indefinitely increased."

Unable to find work as an engineer, Clarke went to work for General Electric as a supervisor of computers in the Turbine Engineering Department. Here she directed women computers who were calculating the mechanical stresses in turbines. In 1921, Clarke took a leave of absence from GE to teach physics at the Constantinople Women's College in Turkey because she was not allowed to do electrical engineering work, was not earning the same salary and had a lower professional status as men doing the same work.

== Career ==
In 1922, when she returned from Turkey, she was offered a job by GE as a salaried electrical engineer in the Central Station Engineering Department – the first professional female electrical engineer in the United States.

Clarke’s area of specialty was electric power systems and problems related to their operations. She developed charts that served as calculating devices to enable GE engineers to determine how currents were distributed among transmission lines. Her charts saved valuable calculating time during World War II.

During this time, she invented the Clarke calculator, an early graphing calculator, a simple graphical device that solved equations involving electric current, voltage and impedance in power transmission lines. The device could solve line equations involving hyperbolic functions ten times faster than previous methods. She filed a patent for the calculator in 1921 and it was granted in 1925. This was one of the three patents she received over the course of her career.

Her background in mathematics helped her achieve fame in her field. She authored or co-authored 18 technical papers during her employment at GE and was an expert on hyperbolic functions, equivalent circuits, and graphical analysis of electric power systems. On February 8, 1926, she showed the use of hyperbolic functions for calculating the maximum power that a line could carry without instability. The paper was of importance because transmission lines were getting longer, leading to greater loads and more chances for system instability, and Clarke's paper provided a model that applied to large systems. Two of her later papers won awards from the AIEE: the Best Regional Paper Prize in 1932 and the Best National Paper Prize in 1941.

Her work was critical for the growth and development of the U.S. electric grid in the 1920s and 1930s. In 1930, Clarke became the head of the engineers at GE studying power stability. In 1933, Clarke moved to GE’s Analytical Division where she performed apparatus and system analysis.

She also worked on the design and building of hydroelectric dams in the West including Hoover Dam, contributing her electrical expertise to develop and install the turbines that generate hydropower there to this day.

In 1943, Clarke wrote an influential textbook in the field of power engineering, Circuit Analysis of A-C Power Systems, based on her notes for lectures to GE engineers. This two-volume textbook teaches the method of symmetrical components. This is a mathematical means for engineers to study and solve problems of power system losses and the performance of electrical equipment. Clarke adopted this system to the three-phase components that are the basis of the electrical grid in the United States. This textbook was used as the basis of education for electrical engineers for many years.

She retired from General Electric in 1945 and bought a farm in Howard County, Maryland. But she did not stay retired for long.

In 1947, she joined the faculty of the Electrical Engineering Department at the University of Texas at Austin, making her the first female professor of electrical engineering in the country. She participated on numerous committees and served as graduate student advisor. She encouraged graduate students and assistant professors to publish early in their careers. She taught for 10 years and retired in 1956.

== Honors, awards and affiliations ==
Clarke was a Fellow of the American Institute of Electrical Engineers. In 1954, she received the Society of Women Engineers (SWE) Achievement Award, "in recognition of her many original contributions to stability theory and circuit analysis." Clarke was selected for inclusion in Women of Achievement in Maryland History in 1998 and was also included in American National Biography and Notable American Women of the Modern Period.

Clarke’s accomplishments continue to be recognized. In 2003, Clarke was inducted into the Maryland Women's Hall of Fame. In 2015, Clarke was inducted into the National Inventors Hall of Fame. In 2016, the University of Texas at Austin established the Edith Clarke Woman of Excellence Award to honor outstanding female faculty.

== Legacy ==
Clarke was the first woman to earn as MS in electrical engineering from MIT. She was the first woman to be professionally employed as an electrical engineer in the United States and the first female professor of electrical engineering in the country. She was the first woman to deliver a paper at the American Institute of Electrical Engineers’ (AIEE) annual meeting.

Clarke received Tau Beta Pi’s Women’s Badge (#95). In 1948, Clarke was one of the first three female Fellows of the American Institute of Electrical Engineers. She was the first woman to be accepted as a full voting member in the American Institute of Electrical Engineers.

Clarke is credited with helping the electric grid grow, with helping that grid remain stable and reliable, and laying the foundation for the smart grid – the grid of the future. She was the first person who used an analyzer to obtain data about power networks. The U.S. Department of Energy calls her efforts “the first step toward smart grid technology. She could be called the Smart Grid’s ‘Founding Mother.’”

In an interview with The Daily Texan on March 14, 1948, Clarke observed: "There is no demand for women engineers, as such, as there are for women doctors; but there's always a demand for anyone who can do a good piece of work."
