= Air gap (magnetic) =

Term in electrical engineering

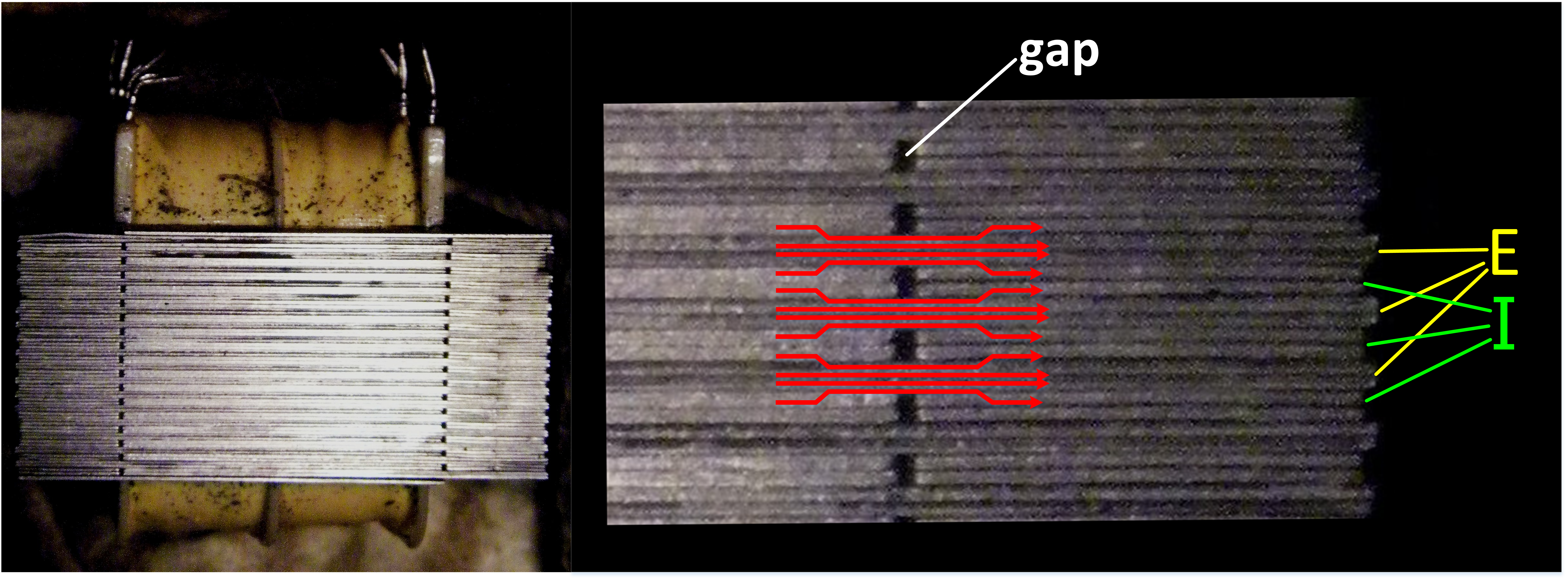
Air gap in a variant of the E-I transformer design. The side view is on the left, the right picture is a close-up of the gapped area. The orientation of E- and I-shaped components changes in the different layers thus creating alternating gaps on both sides. The gaps inhibit the eddy currents (each E and I plate is insulated), but the magnetic flux (red) is able to pass through the remaining "bridges".

Air gap in magnetic circuits is a term used to define an intentional gap left in the magnetic material.

In stationary devices, like inductors and transformers, the air gap is used for a few purposes:

- to minimize the magnetic saturation of their cores due to the direct current (DC) that might be flowing through the coils. Without saturation the inductance (and thus the blocking capability) of a choke stays constant regardless of the DC current flowing;
- counter-intuitively, if a DC magnetization is present in an inductor, an increased (up to some limit) air gap actually incrementally increases the effective inductance;
- in a shunt reactor an air gap is used for two reasons:
  - with an ungapped core the reluctance is small, so very little reactive power is obtained with the disproportionate effect of the iron loss;
  - an increase of the gap reduces the ratio of the total loss to the reactive power, with the limiting factor being the increased heating due to the copper loss.

The total gap is frequently made of a series of small gaps to limit the effect of eddy currents in the core.

When one of the circuit-forming parts of the machine is moving with respect to another (for example, the rotor of an alternator or motor rotates while the stator is stationary), the gap is an obvious mechanical necessity and is typically detrimental to the performance of the machine, since extra power is required to overcome the added reluctance. However, a larger air gap in a synchronous generator is associated with higher short circuit ratio, an often desirable trait.

== Sources ==
- Considine, D.M.; Considine, G.D. (2013). "Air gap". Van Nostrand’s Scientific Encyclopedia. Springer US. ISBN 978-1-4757-6918-0.
- Boldea, I. (2018). Electric Generators Handbook - Two Volume Set. CRC Press. ISBN 978-1-4987-2351-0.
- Terman, F.E. (1955). Electronic and Radio Engineering. Electronics engineering series. McGraw-Hill. ISBN 978-0-07-063510-4.
- Calvert, James (2001). "Inside Transformers". University of Denver. Archived from the original on May 9, 2007.
- Pansini, A.J. (1999). Electrical Transformers and Power Equipment. Fairmont Press. ISBN 978-0-88173-311-2.
- Brooks, H. B. (1931). "Design of Standards of Inductance, and the Proposed Use of Model Reactors in the Design of Air-Core and Iron-Core Reactors". Journal of Research of the National Bureau of Standards. Vol. 7. U.S. Government Printing Office. pp. 290–328.
