= Wagner graph =

Cubic graph with 8 vertices and 12 edges

- The Wagner graph
- Named after: Klaus Wagner
- Vertices: 8
- Edges: 12
- Radius: 2
- Diameter: 2
- Girth: 4
- Automorphisms: 16 (D_{8})
- Chromatic number: 3
- Chromatic index: 3
- Genus: 1
- Spectrum: $$\begin{pmatrix}3 & 1 & \sqrt{2}-1 & -1 &  -\sqrt{2}-1 \\1 & 2 & 2 &  1 & 2 \end{pmatrix}$$
- Properties: Cubic; Hamiltonian; Triangle-free; Vertex-transitive; Toroidal; Apex
- Notation: M_{8}

In the mathematical field of graph theory, the Wagner graph is a 3-regular graph with 8 vertices and 12 edges. It is the 8-vertex Möbius ladder graph.

== Properties ==
As a Möbius ladder, the Wagner graph is nonplanar but has crossing number one, making it an apex graph. It can be embedded without crossings on a torus or projective plane, so it is also a toroidal graph. It has girth 4, diameter 2, radius 2, chromatic number 3, chromatic index 3 and is both 3-vertex-connected and 3-edge-connected.

The Wagner graph has 392 spanning trees; it and the complete bipartite graph K_{3,3} have the most spanning trees among all cubic graphs with the same number of vertices.

The Wagner graph is a vertex-transitive graph but is not edge-transitive. Its full automorphism group is isomorphic to the dihedral group D_{8} of order 16, the group of symmetries of an octagon, including both rotations and reflections.

The characteristic polynomial of the Wagner graph is

$$(x-3)(x-1)^2(x+1)(x^2+2x-1)^2.$$

It is the only graph with this characteristic polynomial, making it a graph determined by its spectrum.

The Wagner graph is triangle-free and has independence number three, providing one half of the proof that the Ramsey number R(3,4) (the least number n such that any n-vertex graph contains either a triangle or a four-vertex independent set) is 9.

== Graph minors ==
Möbius ladders play an important role in the theory of graph minors. The earliest result of this type is a 1937 theorem of Klaus Wagner (part of a cluster of results known as Wagner's theorem) that graphs with no K_{5} minor can be formed by using clique-sum operations to combine planar graphs and the Möbius ladder M_{8}. For this reason M_{8} is called the Wagner graph.

The Wagner graph is also one of four minimal forbidden minors for the graphs of treewidth at most three (the other three being the complete graph K_{5}, the graph of the regular octahedron, and the graph of the pentagonal prism) and one of four minimal forbidden minors for the graphs of branchwidth at most three (the other three being K_{5}, the graph of the octahedron, and the cube graph).

== Construction ==
The Wagner graph is a cubic Hamiltonian graph and can be defined by the LCF notation [4]^{8}. It is an instance of an Andrásfai graph, a type of circulant graph in which the vertices can be arranged in a cycle and each vertex is connected to the other vertices whose positions differ by a number that is 1 (mod 3). It is also isomorphic to the circular clique K_{8/3}.

It can be drawn as a ladder graph with 4 rungs made cyclic on a topological Möbius strip.

== Gallery ==
The chromatic number of the Wagner graph is 3.

The chromatic index of the Wagner graph is 3.

The Wagner graph drawn on the Möbius strip.
