= Klaus Wagner =

German mathematician (1910–2000)

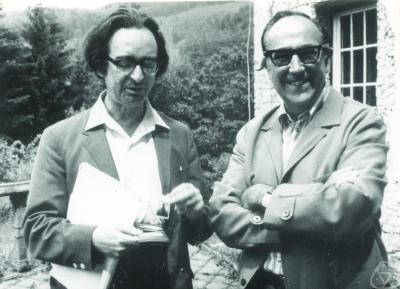
- Klaus Wagner (right) and Frank Harary at Oberwolfach, 1972
- Born: March 31, 1910
- Died: February 6, 2000 (aged 89)
- Education: University of Cologne
- Scientific career
- Fields: Mathematics

Klaus Wagner (March 31, 1910 – February 6, 2000) was a German mathematician known for his contributions to graph theory.

== Education and career ==
Wagner studied topology at the University of Cologne under the supervision of Karl Dörge who had been a student of Issai Schur. Wagner received his Ph.D. in 1937, with a dissertation concerning the Jordan curve theorem and four color theorem, and taught at Cologne for many years himself. In 1970, he moved to the University of Duisburg, where he remained until his retirement in 1978.

== Graph minors ==
The Wagner graph, an eight-vertex Möbius ladder arising in Wagner's characterization of K_{5}-free graphs.

Wagner is known for his contributions to graph theory and particularly the theory of graph minors, graphs that can be formed from a larger graph by contracting and removing edges.

Wagner's theorem characterizes the planar graphs as exactly those graphs that do not have as a minor either a complete graph K_{5} on five vertices or a complete bipartite graph K_{3,3} with three vertices on each side of its bipartition. That is, these two graphs are the only minor-minimal non-planar graphs. It is closely related to, but should be distinguished from, Kuratowski's theorem, which states that the planar graphs are exactly those graphs that do not contain as a subgraph a subdivision of K_{5} or K_{3,3}.

Another result of his, also known as Wagner's theorem, is that a four-connected graph is planar if and only if it has no K_{5} minor. This implies a characterization of the graphs with no K_{5} minor as being constructed from planar graphs and Wagner graph (an eight-vertex Möbius ladder) by clique-sums, operations that glue together subgraphs at cliques of up to three vertices and then possibly remove edges from those cliques. This characterization was used by Wagner to show that the case k = 5 of the Hadwiger conjecture on the chromatic number of K_{k}-minor-free graphs is equivalent to the four color theorem. Analogous characterizations of other families of graphs in terms of the summands of their clique-sum decompositions have since become standard in graph minor theory.

Wagner conjectured in the 1930s (although this conjecture was not published until later) that in any infinite set of graphs, one graph is isomorphic to a minor of another. The truth of this conjecture implies that any family of graphs closed under the operation of taking minors (as planar graphs are) can automatically be characterized by finitely many forbidden minors analogously to Wagner's theorem characterizing the planar graphs. Neil Robertson and Paul Seymour finally published a proof of Wagner's conjecture in 2004 and it is now known as the Robertson–Seymour theorem.

== Recognition ==
Wagner was honored in 1990 by a festschrift on graph theory, and in June 2000, following Wagner's death, the University of Cologne hosted a Festkolloquium in his memory.

== Selected publications ==
- Wagner, K. (1937), "Über eine Eigenschaft der ebenen Komplexe", Mathematische Annalen, 114: 570–590, doi:10.1007/BF01594196, S2CID 123534907.
