= Forbidden graph characterization =

Describing a family of graphs by excluding certain (sub)graphs

The bipartite graphs, which can have their vertices partitioned into 2 sets such that no vertices in each set are adjacent to any other within the same set, are precisely described by the forbidden characterization of having no odd cycle graphs as subgraphs.

In graph theory, a branch of mathematics, many important families of graphs can be described by a finite set of individual graphs that do not belong to the family and further exclude all graphs from the family which contain any of these forbidden graphs as (induced) subgraph or minor.

A prototypical example of this phenomenon is Kuratowski's theorem, which states that a graph is planar (can be drawn without crossings in the plane) if and only if it does not contain either of two forbidden graphs, the complete graph K_{5} and the complete bipartite graph K_{3,3}. For Kuratowski's theorem, the notion of containment is that of graph homeomorphism, in which a subdivision of one graph appears as a subgraph of the other. Thus, every graph either has a planar drawing (in which case it belongs to the family of planar graphs) or it has a subdivision of at least one of these two graphs as a subgraph (in which case it does not belong to the planar graphs).

== Definition ==
More generally, a forbidden graph characterization is a method of specifying a family of graph, or hypergraph, structures, by specifying substructures that are forbidden to exist within any graph in the family. Different families vary in the nature of what is forbidden. In general, a structure G is a member of a family $\mathcal{F}$ if and only if a forbidden substructure is not contained in G. The forbidden substructure might be one of:

- subgraphs, smaller graphs obtained from subsets of the vertices and edges of a larger graph,
- induced subgraphs, smaller graphs obtained by selecting a subset of the vertices and using all edges with both endpoints in that subset,
- homeomorphic subgraphs (also called topological minors), smaller graphs obtained from subgraphs by collapsing paths of degree-two vertices to single edges, or
- graph minors, smaller graphs obtained from subgraphs by arbitrary edge contractions.

The set of structures that are forbidden from belonging to a given graph family can also be called an obstruction set for that family.

Forbidden graph characterizations may be used in algorithms for testing whether a graph belongs to a given family. In many cases, it is possible to test in polynomial time whether a given graph contains any of the members of the obstruction set, and therefore whether it belongs to the family defined by that obstruction set.

In order for a family to have a forbidden graph characterization, with a particular type of substructure, the family must be closed under substructures. That is, every substructure (of a given type) of a graph in the family must be another graph in the family. Equivalently, if a graph is not part of the family, all larger graphs containing it as a substructure must also be excluded from the family. When this is true, there always exists an obstruction set (the set of graphs that are not in the family but whose smaller substructures all belong to the family). However, for some notions of what a substructure is, this obstruction set could be infinite. The Robertson–Seymour theorem proves that, for the particular case of graph minors, a family that is closed under minors always has a finite obstruction set.

== List of forbidden characterizations for graphs and hypergraphs ==
Family	Obstructions	Relation	Reference
Forests	Loops, pairs of parallel edges, and cycles of all lengths	Subgraph	Definition
Forests	A loop (for multigraphs) or triangle K_{3} (for simple graphs)	Graph minor	Definition
Linear forests	[A loop / triangle K_{3} (see above)] and star K_{1,3}	Graph minor	Definition
Claw-free graphs	Star K_{1,3}	Induced subgraph	Definition
Comparability graphs		Induced subgraph	
Triangle-free graphs	Triangle K_{3}	Induced subgraph	Definition
Planar graphs	K_{5} and K_{3,3}	Homeomorphic subgraph	Kuratowski's theorem
Planar graphs	K_{5} and K_{3,3}	Graph minor	Wagner's theorem
Outerplanar graphs	K_{4} and K_{2,3}	Graph minor	Diestel (2000), p. 107
Graphs of fixed genus	A finite obstruction set	Graph minor	Diestel (2000), p. 275
Apex graphs	A finite obstruction set	Graph minor	
Linklessly embeddable graphs	The Petersen family	Graph minor	
Bipartite graphs	Odd cycles	Subgraph	
Chordal graphs	Cycles of length 4 or more	Induced subgraph	
Perfect graphs	Cycles of odd length 5 or more or their complements	Induced subgraph	
Line graph of graphs	9 forbidden subgraphs	Induced subgraph	
Graph unions of cactus graphs	The four-vertex diamond graph formed by removing an edge from the complete graph K_{4}	Graph minor	
Ladder graphs	K_{2,3} and its dual graph	Homeomorphic subgraph	
Split graphs	$C_4, C_5, \bar{C}_4 \left(= K_2 + K_2\right)$	Induced subgraph	
2-connected series–parallel (treewidth ≤ 2, branchwidth ≤ 2)	K_{4}	Graph minor	Diestel (2000), p. 327
Treewidth ≤ 3	K_{5}, octahedron, pentagonal prism, Wagner graph	Graph minor	
Branchwidth ≤ 3	K_{5}, octahedron, cube, Wagner graph	Graph minor	
Complement-reducible graphs (cographs)	4-vertex path P_{4}	Induced subgraph	
Trivially perfect graphs	4-vertex path P_{4} and 4-vertex cycle C_{4}	Induced subgraph	
Threshold graphs	4-vertex path P_{4}, 4-vertex cycle C_{4}, and complement of C_{4}	Induced subgraph	
Line graph of 3-uniform linear hypergraphs	A finite list of forbidden induced subgraphs with minimum degree at least 19	Induced subgraph	
Line graph of k-uniform linear hypergraphs, k > 3	A finite list of forbidden induced subgraphs with minimum edge degree at least 2k^{2} − 3k + 1	Induced subgraph	
Graphs ΔY-reducible to a single vertex	A finite list of at least 68 billion distinct (1,2,3)-clique sums	Graph minor	
Graphs of spectral radius at most $\lambda$	A finite obstruction set exists if and only if $\lambda < \sqrt{2 + \sqrt{5}}$ and $\lambda \neq \beta_m^{1/2} + \beta_m^{-1/2}$ for any $m \ge 2$, where $\beta_m$ is the largest root of $x^{m+1} = 1 + x + \dots + x^{m-1}$.	Subgraph / induced subgraph	
Cluster graphs	three-vertex path graph	Induced subgraph	
General theorems
A family defined by an induced-hereditary property	A, possibly non-finite, obstruction set	Induced subgraph	
A family defined by a minor-hereditary property	A finite obstruction set	Graph minor	Robertson–Seymour theorem

== See also ==
- Erdős–Hajnal conjecture
- Forbidden subgraph problem
- Matroid minor
- Zarankiewicz problem
