= Kuratowski's theorem =

On forbidden subgraphs in planar graphs

A subdivision of K_{3,3} in the generalized Petersen graph G(9,2), showing that the graph is nonplanar.

In graph theory, Kuratowski's theorem is a mathematical forbidden graph characterization of planar graphs, named after Kazimierz Kuratowski. It states that a finite graph is planar if and only if it does not contain a subgraph that is a subdivision of $K_5$ (the complete graph on five vertices) nor of $K_{3,3}$ (a complete bipartite graph on six vertices, three of which connect to each of the other three, also known as the utility graph).

== Statement ==
A planar graph is a graph whose vertices can be represented by points in the Euclidean plane, and whose edges can be represented by simple curves in the same plane connecting the points representing their endpoints, such that no two curves intersect except at a common endpoint. Planar graphs are often drawn with straight line segments representing their edges, but by Fáry's theorem allowing curved edges or requiring straight edges makes no difference to their graph-theoretic characterization.

A subdivision of a graph is a graph formed by subdividing its edges into paths of one or more edges. Kuratowski's theorem states that a finite graph $G$ is planar if it is not possible to subdivide the edges of $K_5$ or $K_{3,3}$, and then possibly add additional edges and vertices, to form a graph isomorphic to $G$. Equivalently, a finite graph is planar if and only if it does not contain a subgraph that is homeomorphic to $K_5$ or $K_{3,3}$.

== Kuratowski subgraphs ==
Proof without words that a hypercube graph is non-planar using Kuratowski's or Wagner's theorems and finding either K_{5} (top) or K_{3,3} (bottom) subgraphs

If $G$ is a graph that contains a subgraph $H$ that is a subdivision of $K_5$ or $K_{3,3}$, then $H$ is known as a Kuratowski subgraph of $G$. With this notation, Kuratowski's theorem can be expressed succinctly: a graph is planar if and only if it does not have a Kuratowski subgraph.

The two graphs $K_5$ and $K_{3,3}$ are nonplanar, as may be shown either by a case analysis or an argument involving Euler's formula. Additionally, subdividing a graph cannot turn a nonplanar graph into a planar graph: if a subdivision of a graph $G$ has a planar drawing, the paths of the subdivision form curves that may be used to represent the edges of $G$ itself. Therefore, a graph that contains a Kuratowski subgraph cannot be planar. The more difficult direction in proving Kuratowski's theorem is to show that, if a graph is nonplanar, it must contain a Kuratowski subgraph.

== Algorithmic implications ==
A Kuratowski subgraph of a nonplanar graph can be found in linear time, as measured by the size of the input graph. This allows the correctness of a planarity testing algorithm to be verified for nonplanar inputs, as it is straightforward to test whether a given subgraph is or is not a Kuratowski subgraph. Usually, non-planar graphs contain a large number of Kuratowski-subgraphs. The extraction of these subgraphs is needed, e.g., in branch and cut algorithms for crossing minimization. It is possible to extract a large number of Kuratowski subgraphs in time dependent on their total size.

== History ==
Kazimierz Kuratowski published his theorem in 1930. The theorem was independently proved by Orrin Frink and Paul Smith, also in 1930, but their proof was never published. The special case of cubic planar graphs (for which the only minimal forbidden subgraph is $K_{3,3}$) was also independently proved by Karl Menger in 1930. Since then, several new proofs of the theorem have been discovered.

In the Soviet Union, Kuratowski's theorem was known as either the Pontryagin–Kuratowski theorem or the Kuratowski–Pontryagin theorem, as the theorem was reportedly proved independently by Lev Pontryagin around 1927. However, as Pontryagin never published his proof, this usage has not spread to other places.

== Related results ==
A closely related result, Wagner's theorem, characterizes the planar graphs by their minors in terms of the same two forbidden graphs $K_5$ and $K_{3,3}$. Every Kuratowski subgraph is a special case of a minor of the same type, and while the reverse is not true, it is not difficult to find a Kuratowski subgraph (of one type or the other) from one of these two forbidden minors; therefore, these two theorems are equivalent.

An extension is the Robertson–Seymour theorem, stating that every class of graphs closed under taking minors (as the planar graphs are) can be characterized in an analogous way by a finite set of forbidden minors.

== See also ==
- Kelmans–Seymour conjecture, that 5-connected nonplanar graphs contain a subdivision of $K_5$
