= Graph expansion =

Graph expansion may refer to:

- Expander graph
- Homeomorphism (graph theory)
