= Line graph of a hypergraph =

Generalization of line graphs to hypergraphs

In graph theory, particularly in the theory of hypergraphs, the line graph of a hypergraph H, denoted L(H), is the graph whose vertex set is the set of the hyperedges of H, with two vertices adjacent in L(H) when their corresponding hyperedges have a nonempty intersection in H. In other words, L(H) is the intersection graph of a family of finite sets. It is a generalization of the line graph of a graph.

Questions about line graphs of hypergraphs are often generalizations of questions about line graphs of graphs. For instance, a hypergraph whose edges all have size k is called k-uniform. (A 2-uniform hypergraph is a graph). In hypergraph theory, it is often natural to require that hypergraphs be k-uniform. Every graph is the line graph of some hypergraph, but, given a fixed edge size k, not every graph is a line graph of some k-uniform hypergraph. A main problem is to characterize those that are, for each k ≥ 3.

A hypergraph is linear if each pair of hyperedges intersects in at most one vertex. Every graph is the line graph, not only of some hypergraph, but of some linear hypergraph.

== Line graphs of k-uniform hypergraphs, k ≥ 3 ==
Beineke characterized line graphs of graphs by a list of 9 forbidden induced subgraphs. (See the article on line graphs.) No characterization by forbidden induced subgraphs is known of line graphs of k-uniform hypergraphs for any k ≥ 3, and Lovász showed there is no such characterization by a finite list if k = 3.

Krausz characterized line graphs of graphs in terms of clique covers. (See Line Graphs.) A global characterization of Krausz type for the line graphs of k-uniform hypergraphs for any k ≥ 3 was given by Berge

== Line graphs of k-uniform linear hypergraphs, k ≥ 3 ==
A global characterization of Krausz type for the line graphs of k-uniform linear hypergraphs for any k ≥ 3 was given by Naik, Rao, Shrikhande, and Singhi. At the same time, they found a finite list of forbidden induced subgraphs for linear 3-uniform hypergraphs with minimum vertex degree at least 69. Metelsky|l and Tyshkevich and Jacobson, Kézdy, and Lehel improved this bound to 19. At last Skums, Suzdal', and Tyshkevich reduced this bound to 16. Metelsky and Tyshkevich also proved that, if k > 3, no such finite list exists for linear k-uniform hypergraphs, no matter what lower bound is placed on the degree.

The difficulty in finding a characterization of linear k-uniform hypergraphs is due to the fact that there are infinitely many forbidden induced subgraphs. To give examples, for m > 0, consider a chain of m diamond graphs such that the consecutive diamonds share vertices of degree two. For k ≥ 3, add pendant edges at every vertex of degree 2 or 4 to get one of the families of minimal forbidden subgraphs of Naik, Rao, Shrikhande, and Singhi as shown here. This does not rule out either the existence of a polynomial recognition or the possibility of a forbidden induced subgraph characterization similar to Beineke's of line graphs of graphs.

There are some interesting characterizations available for line graphs of linear k-uniform hypergraphs due to various authors under constraints on the minimum degree or the minimum edge degree of G. Minimum edge degree at least k^{3}-2k^{2}+1 in Naik, Rao, Shrikhande, and Singhi is reduced to 2k^{2}-3k+1 in Jacobson, Kézdy, and Lehel and Zverovich to characterize line graphs of k-uniform linear hypergraphs for any k ≥ 3.

The complexity of recognizing line graphs of linear k-uniform hypergraphs without any constraint on minimum degree (or minimum edge-degree) is not known. For k = 3 and minimum degree at least 19, recognition is possible in polynomial time. Skums, Suzdal', and Tyshkevich reduced the minimum degree to 10.

There are many interesting open problems and conjectures in Naik et al., Jacoboson et al., Metelsky et al. and Zverovich.

== Disjointness graph ==
The disjointness graph of a hypergraph H, denoted D(H), is the graph whose vertex set is the set of the hyperedges of H, with two vertices adjacent in D(H) when their corresponding hyperedges are disjoint in H. In other words, D(H) is the complement graph of L(H). A clique in D(H) corresponds to an independent set in L(H), and vice versa.
