= Robertson–Seymour theorem =

Finiteness of sets of forbidden graph minors

In graph theory, the Robertson–Seymour theorem (also called the graph minors theorem) states that the undirected graphs, partially ordered by the graph minor relationship, form a well-quasi-ordering. Equivalently, every family of graphs that is closed under taking minors can be defined by a finite set of forbidden minors, in the same way that Wagner's theorem characterizes the planar graphs as being the graphs that do not have the complete graph $K_5$ or the complete bipartite graph $K_{3,3}$ as minors.

The Robertson–Seymour theorem is named after mathematicians Neil Robertson and Paul D. Seymour, who proved it in a series of twenty papers spanning over 500 pages from 1983 to 2004. Before its proof, the statement of the theorem was known as Wagner's conjecture after the German mathematician Klaus Wagner, although Wagner said he never conjectured it.

A weaker result for trees is implied by Kruskal's tree theorem, which was conjectured in 1937 by Andrew Vázsonyi and proved in 1960 independently by Joseph Kruskal and S. Tarkowski.

== Statement ==
A minor of an undirected graph $G$ is any graph that may be obtained from $G$ by a sequence of zero or more contractions of edges of $G$ and deletions of edges and vertices of $G$. The minor relationship forms a partial order on the set of all distinct finite undirected graphs, as it obeys the three axioms of partial orders: it is reflexive (every graph is a minor of itself), transitive (a minor of a minor of $G$ is itself a minor of $G$), and antisymmetric (if two graphs $G$ and $G$ are minors of each other, then they must be isomorphic). However, if graphs that are isomorphic may nonetheless be considered as distinct objects, then the minor ordering on graphs forms a preorder, a relation that is reflexive and transitive but not necessarily antisymmetric.

A preorder is said to form a well-quasi-ordering if it contains neither an infinite descending chain nor an infinite antichain. For instance, the usual ordering on the non-negative integers is a well-quasi-ordering, but the same ordering on the set of all integers is not, because it contains the infinite descending chain 0, −1, −2, −3... Another example is the set of positive integers ordered by divisibility, which has no infinite descending chains, but where the prime numbers constitute an infinite antichain.

The Robertson–Seymour theorem states that finite undirected graphs and graph minors form a well-quasi-ordering. The graph minor relationship does not contain any infinite descending chain, because each contraction or deletion reduces the number of edges and vertices of the graph (a non-negative integer). The nontrivial part of the theorem is that there are no infinite antichains, infinite sets of graphs that are all unrelated to each other by the minor ordering. If $\mathcal{S}$ is a set of graphs, and $\mathcal{M}$ is a subset of $\mathcal{S}$ containing one representative graph for each equivalence class of minimal elements (graphs that belong to $\mathcal{S}$ but for which no proper minor belongs to $\mathcal{S}$), then $\mathcal{M}$ forms an antichain; therefore, an equivalent way of stating the theorem is that, in any infinite set $\mathcal{S}$ of graphs, there must be only a finite number of non-isomorphic minimal elements.

Another equivalent form of the theorem is that, in any infinite set $\mathcal{S}$ of graphs, there must be a pair of graphs one of which is a minor of the other. The statement that every infinite set has finitely many minimal elements implies this form of the theorem, for if there are only finitely many minimal elements, then each of the remaining graphs must belong to a pair of this type with one of the minimal elements. And in the other direction, this form of the theorem implies the statement that there can be no infinite antichains, because an infinite antichain is a set that does not contain any pair related by the minor relation.

== Forbidden minor characterizations ==
A family $\mathcal{F}$ of graphs is said to be closed under the operation of taking minors if every minor of a graph in $\mathcal{F}$ also belongs to $\mathcal{F}$. If $\mathcal{F}$ is a minor-closed family, then let $\mathcal{S}$ be the class of graphs that are not in $\mathcal{F}$ (the complement of $\mathcal{F}$). According to the Robertson–Seymour theorem, there exists a finite set $\mathcal{H}$ of minimal elements in $\mathcal{S}$. These minimal elements form a forbidden graph characterization of $\mathcal{F}$: the graphs in $\mathcal{F}$ are exactly the graphs that do not have any graph in $\mathcal{H}$ as a minor. The members of $\mathcal{H}$ are called the excluded minors (or forbidden minors, or minor-minimal obstructions) for the family $\mathcal{F}$.

For example, the planar graphs are closed under taking minors: contracting an edge in a planar graph, or removing edges or vertices from the graph, cannot destroy its planarity. Therefore, the planar graphs have a forbidden minor characterization, which in this case is given by Wagner's theorem: the set $\mathcal{H}$ of minor-minimal nonplanar graphs contains exactly two graphs, the complete graph $K_5$ and the complete bipartite graph $K_{3,3}$, and the planar graphs are exactly the graphs that do not have a minor in the set $\mathcal{H}=\{K_5,K_{3,3}\}.$

The existence of forbidden minor characterizations for all minor-closed graph families is an equivalent way of stating the Robertson–Seymour theorem. For, suppose that every minor-closed family $\mathcal{F}$ has a finite set $\mathcal{H}$ of minimal forbidden minors, and let $\mathcal{S}$ be any infinite set of graphs. Determine $\mathcal{F}$ from $\mathcal{S}$ as the family of graphs that do not have a minor in $\mathcal{S}$. Then $\mathcal{F}$ is minor-closed and has a finite set $\mathcal{H}$ of minimal forbidden minors. Let $\mathcal{C}$ be the complement of $\mathcal{F}$. $\mathcal{S}$ is a subset of $\mathcal{C}$ since $\mathcal{S}$ and $\mathcal{F}$ are disjoint, and $\mathcal{H}$ are the minimal graphs in $\mathcal{C}$. Consider a graph $G$ in $\mathcal{H}$. $G$ cannot have a proper minor in $\mathcal{S}$ since $G$ is minimal in $\mathcal{C}$. At the same time, $G$ must have a minor in $S$, since otherwise $G$ would be an element in $\mathcal{F}$. Therefore, $G$ is an element in $\mathcal{S}$, i.e., $\mathcal{H}$ is a subset of $\mathcal{S}$, and all other graphs in $\mathcal{S}$ have a minor among the graphs in $\mathcal{H}$, so $\mathcal{H}$ is the finite set of minimal elements of $\mathcal{S}$.

To demonstrate the other direction of the equivalence, assume that every set of graphs has a finite subset of minimal graphs and let a minor-closed set $\mathcal{F}$ be given. We want to find a set $\mathcal{H}$ of graphs such that a graph is in $\mathcal{F}$ if and only if it does not have a minor in $\mathcal{H}$. Let $\mathcal{E}$ be the graphs which are not minors of any graph in $\mathcal{F}$, and let $\mathcal{H}$ be the finite set of minimal graphs in $\mathcal{E}$. Now, let an arbitrary graph $G$ be given. Assume first that $G$ is in $\mathcal{F}$. $G$ cannot have a minor in $\mathcal{H}$ since $G$ is in $\mathcal{F}$ and $\mathcal{H}$ is a subset of $\mathcal{E}$. Now assume that $G$ is not in $\mathcal{F}$. Then $G$ is not a minor of any graph in $\mathcal{F}$, since $\mathcal{F}$ is minor-closed. Therefore, $G$ is in $\mathcal{E}$, so $G$ has a minor in $\mathcal{H}$.

== Examples of minor-closed families ==
The following sets of finite graphs are minor-closed, and therefore (by the Robertson–Seymour theorem) have forbidden minor characterizations:

- forests, linear forests (disjoint unions of path graphs), pseudoforests, and cactus graphs;
- planar graphs, outerplanar graphs, apex graphs (formed by adding a single vertex to a planar graph), toroidal graphs, and the graphs that can be embedded on any fixed two-dimensional manifold;
- graphs that are linklessly embeddable in Euclidean 3-space, and graphs that are knotlessly embeddable in Euclidean 3-space;
- graphs with a feedback vertex set of size bounded by some fixed constant; graphs with Colin de Verdière graph invariant bounded by some fixed constant; graphs with treewidth, pathwidth, or branchwidth bounded by some fixed constant.

== Obstruction sets ==
The Petersen family, the obstruction set for linkless embedding

Some examples of finite obstruction sets were already known for specific classes of graphs before the Robertson–Seymour theorem was proved. For example, the obstruction for the set of all forests is the loop graph (or, if one restricts to simple graphs, the cycle with three vertices). This means that a graph is a forest if and only if none of its minors is the loop (or, the cycle with three vertices, respectively). The sole obstruction for the set of paths is the tree with four vertices, one of which has degree 3. In these cases, the obstruction set contains a single element, but in general this is not the case. Wagner's theorem states that a graph is planar if and only if it has neither $K_5$ nor $K_{3,3}$ as a minor. In other words, the set $\{K_5,K_{3,3}\}$ is an obstruction set for the set of all planar graphs, and in fact the unique minimal obstruction set. A similar theorem states that $K_4$ and $K_{2,3}$ are the forbidden minors for the set of outerplanar graphs.

Although the Robertson–Seymour theorem extends these results to arbitrary minor-closed graph families, it is not a complete substitute for these results, because it does not provide an explicit description of the obstruction set for any family. For example, it tells us that the set of toroidal graphs has a finite obstruction set, but it does not provide any such set. The complete set of forbidden minors for toroidal graphs remains unknown, but it contains at least 17,535 graphs.

== Polynomial time recognition ==
The Robertson–Seymour theorem has an important consequence in computational complexity, due to the proof by Robertson and Seymour that, for each fixed graph $H$, there is a polynomial time algorithm for testing whether a graph has $H$ as a minor. This algorithm's running time is cubic (in the size of the graph to check), though with a constant factor that depends superpolynomially on the size of the minor $H$. The running time has been improved to quadratic by Kawarabayashi, Kobayashi, and Reed. As a result, for every minor-closed family $\mathcal{F}$, there is polynomial time algorithm for testing whether a graph belongs to $\mathcal{F}$: check whether the given graph contains $H$ for each forbidden minor $H$ in the obstruction set of $\mathcal{F}$.

However, this method requires a specific finite obstruction set to work, and the theorem does not provide one. The theorem proves that such a finite obstruction set exists, and therefore the problem is polynomial because of the above algorithm. However, the algorithm can be used in practice only if such a finite obstruction set is provided. As a result, the theorem proves that the problem can be solved in polynomial time, but does not provide a concrete polynomial-time algorithm for solving it. Such proofs of polynomiality are non-constructive: they prove polynomiality of problems without providing an explicit polynomial-time algorithm. In many specific cases, checking whether a graph is in a given minor-closed family can be done more efficiently: for example, checking whether a graph is planar can be done in linear time.

== Fixed-parameter tractability ==
For graph invariants with the property that, for each $k$, the graphs with invariant at most $k$ are minor-closed, the same method applies. For instance, by this result, treewidth, branchwidth, and pathwidth, vertex cover, and the minimum genus of an embedding are all amenable to this approach, and for any fixed $k$ there is a polynomial time algorithm for testing whether these invariants are at most $k$, in which the exponent in the running time of the algorithm does not depend on $k$. A problem with this property, that it can be solved in polynomial time for any fixed $k$ with an exponent that does not depend on $k$, is known as fixed-parameter tractable.

However, this method does not directly provide a single fixed-parameter-tractable algorithm for computing the parameter value for a given graph with unknown $k$, because of the difficulty of determining the set of forbidden minors. Additionally, the large constant factors involved in these results make them highly impractical. Therefore, the development of explicit fixed-parameter algorithms for these problems, with improved dependence on $k$, has continued to be an important line of research.

== Finite form of the graph minor theorem ==
Friedman, Robertson & Seymour (1987) showed that the following theorem exhibits the independence phenomenon by being unprovable in various formal systems that are much stronger than Peano arithmetic, yet being provable in systems much weaker than ZFC:

Theorem: For every positive integer $n$, there is an integer $m$ so large that if $G_1,\dots, G_m$ is a sequence of finite undirected graphs, where each $G_i$ has size at most $n+i$, then $G_j\le G_k$ for some $j\le k$.

(Here, the size of a graph is the total number of its vertices and edges, and ≤ denotes the minor ordering.)

Friedman uses this result on simple subcubic graphs to construct the fast-growing function, SSCG.

== See also ==
- Graph structure theorem
