= Three utilities problem =

Mathematical puzzle of avoiding crossings

Diagram of the three utilities problem on a plane. All lines are connected, but two of them are crossing.

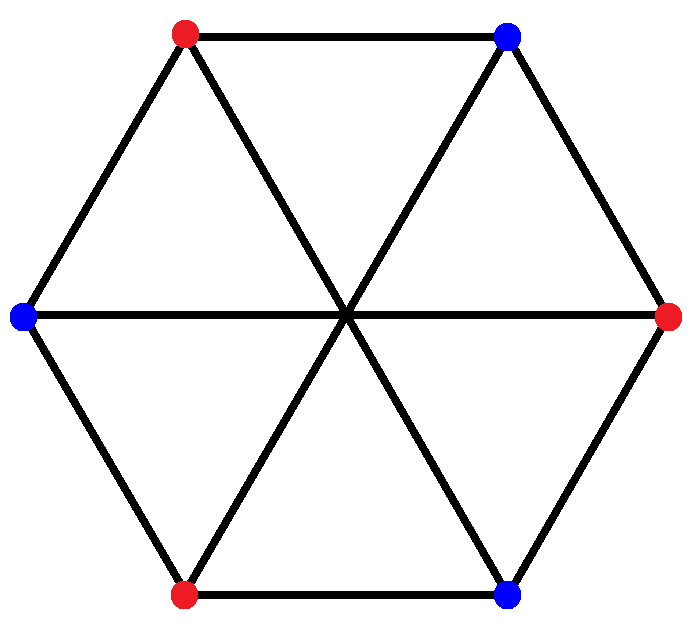
Two views of the utility graph, also known as the Thomsen graph or $K_{3,3}$

The three utilities problem, also known as water, gas and electricity, is a mathematical puzzle that asks for non-crossing connections to be drawn between three houses and three utility companies on a plane. When posing it in the early 20th century, Henry Dudeney wrote that it was already an old problem. It is an impossible puzzle: it is not possible to connect all nine lines without any of them crossing. Versions of the problem on nonplanar surfaces such as a torus or Möbius strip, or that allow connections to pass through other houses or utilities, can be solved.

This puzzle can be formalized as a problem in topological graph theory by asking whether the complete bipartite graph $K_{3,3}$, with vertices representing the houses and utilities and edges representing their connections, has a graph embedding in the plane. The impossibility of the puzzle corresponds to the fact that $K_{3,3}$ is not a planar graph. Multiple proofs of this impossibility are known, and form part of the proof of Kuratowski's theorem characterizing planar graphs by two forbidden subgraphs, one of which is $K_{3,3}$.

The general question of minimizing the number of crossings in drawings of complete bipartite graphs is known as Turán's brick factory problem. For $K_{3,3}$ the minimum number of crossings is one.

$K_{3,3}$ is a graph with six vertices and nine edges, often referred to as the utility graph in reference to the problem. It has also been called the Thomsen graph after the 19th-century chemist Julius Thomsen. It is a well-covered graph, the smallest triangle-free cubic graph, and the smallest non-planar minimally rigid graph.

== History ==
A review of the history of the three utilities problem is given by Kullman (1979). He states that most published references to the problem characterize it as "very ancient". In the earliest publication found by Kullman, Henry Dudeney (1917) names it "water, gas, and electricity". However, Dudeney states that the problem is "as old as the hills...much older than electric lighting, or even gas". Dudeney also published the same puzzle previously, in The Strand Magazine in 1913. A competing claim of priority goes to Sam Loyd, who was quoted by his son in a posthumous biography as having published the problem in 1900.

Another early version of the problem involves connecting three houses to three wells. It is stated similarly to a different (and solvable) puzzle that also involves three houses and three fountains, with all three fountains and one house touching a rectangular wall; the puzzle again involves making non-crossing connections, but only between three designated pairs of houses and wells or fountains, as in modern numberlink puzzles. Loyd's puzzle "The Quarrelsome Neighbors" similarly involves connecting three houses to three gates by three non-crossing paths (rather than nine as in the utilities problem); one house and the three gates are on the wall of a rectangular yard, which contains the other two houses within it.

As well as in the three utilities problem, the graph $K_{3,3}$ appears in late 19th-century and early 20th-century publications both in early studies of structural rigidity and in chemical graph theory, where Julius Thomsen proposed it in 1886 for the then-uncertain structure of benzene. In honor of Thomsen's work, $K_{3,3}$ is sometimes called the Thomsen graph.

== Statement ==
The three utilities problem can be stated as follows:

Suppose three houses each need to be connected to the water, gas, and electricity companies, with a separate line from each house to each company. Is there a way to make all nine connections without any of the lines crossing each other?

The problem is an abstract mathematical puzzle which imposes constraints that would not exist in a practical engineering situation. Its mathematical formalization is part of the field of topological graph theory which studies the embedding of graphs on surfaces. An important part of the puzzle, but one that is often not stated explicitly in informal wordings of the puzzle, is that the houses, companies, and lines must all be placed on a two-dimensional surface with the topology of a plane, and that the lines are not allowed to pass through other buildings; sometimes this is enforced by showing a drawing of the houses and companies, and asking for the connections to be drawn as lines on the same drawing.

In more formal graph-theoretic terms, the problem asks whether the complete bipartite graph $K_{3,3}$ is a planar graph. This graph has six vertices in two subsets of three: one vertex for each house, and one for each utility. It has nine edges, one edge for each of the pairings of a house with a utility, or more abstractly one edge for each pair of a vertex in one subset and a vertex in the other subset. Planar graphs are the graphs that can be drawn without crossings in the plane, and if such a drawing could be found, it would solve the three utilities puzzle.

== Puzzle solutions ==
=== Unsolvability ===
Proof without words: One house is temporarily deleted. The lines connecting the remaining houses with the utilities divide the plane into three regions. Whichever region the deleted house is placed into, the similarly shaded utility is outside the region. By the Jordan curve theorem, a line connecting them must intersect one of the existing lines.

As it is usually presented (on a flat two-dimensional plane), the solution to the utility puzzle is "no": there is no way to make all nine connections without any of the lines crossing each other. In other words, the graph $K_{3,3}$ is not planar. Kazimierz Kuratowski stated in 1930 that $K_{3,3}$ is nonplanar, from which it follows that the problem has no solution. Kullman (1979), however, states that "Interestingly enough, Kuratowski did not publish a detailed proof that [ $K_{3,3}$ ] is non-planar".

One proof of the impossibility of finding a planar embedding of $K_{3,3}$ uses a case analysis involving the Jordan curve theorem. In this solution, one examines different possibilities for the locations of the vertices with respect to the 4-cycles of the graph and shows that they are all inconsistent with a planar embedding.

Alternatively, it is possible to show that any bridgeless bipartite planar graph with $V$ vertices and $E$ edges has $E\le 2V-4$ by combining the Euler formula $V-E+F=2$ (where $F$ is the number of faces of a planar embedding) with the observation that the number of faces is at most half the number of edges (the vertices around each face must alternate between houses and utilities, so each face has at least four edges, and each edge belongs to exactly two faces). In the utility graph, $E=9$ and $2V-4=8$ so in the utility graph it is untrue that $E\le 2V-4$. Because it does not satisfy this inequality, the utility graph cannot be planar.

=== Changing the rules ===
Solution on a Möbius strip

Solution on a torus

A torus allows up to 4 utilities and 4 houses

$K_{3,3}$ is a toroidal graph, which means that it can be embedded without crossings on a torus, a surface of genus one. These embeddings solve versions of the puzzle in which the houses and companies are drawn on a coffee mug or other such surface instead of a flat plane. There is even enough additional freedom on the torus to solve a version of the puzzle with four houses and four utilities. Similarly, if the three utilities puzzle is presented on a sheet of a transparent material, it may be solved after twisting and gluing the sheet to form a Möbius strip.

Another way of changing the rules of the puzzle that would make it solvable, suggested by Henry Dudeney, is to allow utility lines to pass through other houses or utilities than the ones they connect.

== Properties of the utility graph ==
Beyond the utility puzzle, the same graph $K_{3,3}$ comes up in several other mathematical contexts, including rigidity theory, the classification of cages and well-covered graphs, the study of graph crossing numbers, and the theory of graph minors.

=== Rigidity ===
The utility graph $K_{3,3}$ is a Laman graph, meaning that for almost all placements of its vertices in the plane, there is no way to continuously move its vertices while preserving all edge lengths, other than by a rigid motion of the whole plane, and that none of its spanning subgraphs have the same rigidity property. It is the smallest example of a nonplanar Laman graph. Despite being a minimally rigid graph, it has non-rigid embeddings with special placements for its vertices. For general-position embeddings, a polynomial equation describing all possible placements with the same edge lengths has degree 16, meaning that in general there can be at most 16 placements with the same lengths. It is possible to find systems of edge lengths for which up to eight of the solutions to this equation describe realizable placements.

=== Other graph-theoretic properties ===
$K_{3,3}$ is a triangle-free graph, in which every vertex has exactly three neighbors (a cubic graph). Among all such graphs, it is the smallest. Therefore, it is the (3,4)-cage, the smallest graph that has three neighbors per vertex and in which the shortest cycle has length four.

Like all other complete bipartite graphs, it is a well-covered graph, meaning that every maximal independent set has the same size. In this graph, the only two maximal independent sets are the two sides of the bipartition, and are of equal sizes. $K_{3,3}$ is one of only seven 3-regular 3-connected well-covered graphs.

=== Generalizations ===
Drawing of $K_{3,3}$ with one crossing

Two important characterizations of planar graphs, Kuratowski's theorem that the planar graphs are exactly the graphs that contain neither $K_{3,3}$ nor the complete graph $K_5$ as a subdivision, and Wagner's theorem that the planar graphs are exactly the graphs that contain neither $K_{3,3}$ nor $K_5$ as a minor, make use of and generalize the non-planarity of $K_{3,3}$.

Pál Turán's "brick factory problem" asks more generally for a formula for the minimum number of crossings in a drawing of the complete bipartite graph $K_{a,b}$ in terms of the numbers of vertices $a$ and $b$ on the two sides of the bipartition. The utility graph $K_{3,3}$ may be drawn with only one crossing, but not with zero crossings, so its crossing number is one.
