= Wendy Myrvold =

Canadian mathematician and computer scientist

Wendy Joanne Myrvold is a Canadian mathematician and computer scientist known for her work on graph algorithms, planarity testing, and algorithms in enumerative combinatorics. She is a professor emeritus of computer science at the University of Victoria.

Myrvold completed her Ph.D. in 1988 at the University of Waterloo. Her dissertation, The Ally and Adversary Reconstruction Problems, was supervised by Charles Colbourn.
