= Ladder graph =

Planar, undirected graph with 2n vertices and 3n-2 edges

- The ladder graph L_{8}.
- Vertices: $2n$
- Edges: $3n-2$
- Chromatic number: $2$
- Chromatic index: $$\begin{cases} 3 & \text{if } n > 2 \\  2 & \text{if } n = 2 \\  1 & \text {if } n = 1  \end{cases}$$
- Properties: Unit distance Hamiltonian; Planar; Bipartite
- Notation: $L_n$

In the mathematical field of graph theory, the ladder graph L_{n} is a planar, undirected graph with 2n vertices and 3n − 2 edges.

The ladder graph can be obtained as the Cartesian product of two path graphs, one of which has only one edge: L_{n} = P_{n} □ P_{2}.

== Properties ==
By construction, the ladder graph L_{n} is isomorphic to the grid graph G_{2,n} and looks like a ladder with n rungs. It is Hamiltonian with girth 4 (if n>1) and chromatic index 3 (if n>2).

The chromatic number of the ladder graph is 2 and its chromatic polynomial is $(x-1)x(x^2-3x+3)^{(n-1)}$.

The ladder graphs L_{1}, L_{2}, L_{3}, L_{4} and L_{5}.

The chromatic number of the ladder graph is 2.

== Ladder rung graph ==
Sometimes the term "ladder graph" is used for the nP_{2} ladder rung graph, which is the graph union of n copies of the path graph P_{2}.

The ladder rung graphs LR_{1}, LR_{2}, LR_{3}, LR_{4}, and LR_{5}.

== Circular ladder graph ==
The circular ladder graph CL_{n} is constructible by connecting the four 2-degree vertices in a straight way, or by the Cartesian product of a cycle of length n ≥ 3 and an edge. In symbols, CL_{n} = C_{n} □ P_{2}. It has 2n nodes and 3n edges. Like the ladder graph, it is connected, planar and Hamiltonian, but it is bipartite if and only if n is even.

Circular ladder graph are the polyhedral graphs of prisms, so they are more commonly called prism graphs.

Circular ladder graphs:

CL_{3}	CL_{4}	CL_{5}	CL_{6}	CL_{7}	CL_{8}

== Möbius ladder ==
Connecting the four 2-degree vertices of a standard ladder graph crosswise creates a cubic graph called a Möbius ladder.

Two views of the Möbius ladder M_{16} .
