= Homeomorphism (graph theory) =

Graphs that differ only by edge subdivision

In graph theory, two graphs $G$ and $G'$ are homeomorphic if there is a graph isomorphism from some subdivision of $G$ to some subdivision of $G'$. If the edges of a graph are thought of as lines drawn from one vertex to another (as they are usually depicted in diagrams), then two graphs are homeomorphic to each other in the graph-theoretic sense precisely if their diagrams are homeomorphic in the topological sense.

== Subdivision and smoothing ==
In general, a subdivision of a graph G (sometimes known as an expansion) is a graph resulting from the subdivision of edges in G. The subdivision of some edge e with endpoints {u, v} yields a graph containing one new vertex w, and with an edge set replacing e by two new edges, {u, w} and {w, v}. For directed edges, this operation shall preserve their propagating direction.

For example, the edge e, with endpoints {u, v}:

can be subdivided into two edges, e_{1} and e_{2}, connecting to a new vertex w of degree-2, or indegree-1 and outdegree-1 for the directed edge:

Determining whether for graphs G and H, H is homeomorphic to a subgraph of G, is an NP-complete problem.

=== Reversion ===
The reverse operation, smoothing out or smoothing a vertex w with regards to the pair of edges (e_{1}, e_{2}) incident on w, removes both edges containing w and replaces (e_{1}, e_{2}) with a new edge that connects the other endpoints of the pair. Here, it is emphasized that only degree-2 (i.e., 2-valent) vertices can be smoothed. The limit of this operation is realized by the graph that has no more degree-2 vertices.

For example, the simple connected graph with two edges, e_{1} {u, w} and e_{2} {w, v}:

has a vertex (namely w) that can be smoothed away, resulting in:

=== Barycentric subdivisions ===
The barycentric subdivision subdivides each edge of the graph. This is a special subdivision, as it always results in a bipartite graph. This procedure can be repeated, so that the n^{th} barycentric subdivision is the barycentric subdivision of the n−1st barycentric subdivision of the graph. The second such subdivision is always a simple graph.

== Embedding on a surface ==
It is evident that subdividing a graph preserves planarity. Kuratowski's theorem states that

a finite graph is planar if and only if it contains no subgraph homeomorphic to K_{5} (complete graph on five vertices) or K_{3,3} (complete bipartite graph on six vertices, three of which connect to each of the other three).

In fact, a graph homeomorphic to K_{5} or K_{3,3} is called a Kuratowski subgraph.

A generalization, following from the Robertson–Seymour theorem, asserts that for each integer g, there is a finite obstruction set of graphs $L(g) = \left\{G_{i}^{(g)}\right\}$ such that a graph H is embeddable on a surface of genus g if and only if H contains no homeomorphic copy of any of the $G_{i}^{(g)\!}$. For example, $L(0) = \left\{K_{5}, K_{3,3}\right\}$ consists of the Kuratowski subgraphs.

== Example ==
In the following example, graph G and graph H are homeomorphic.

Graph G

Graph H

If G′ is the graph created by subdivision of the outer edges of G and H′ is the graph created by subdivision of the inner edge of H, then G′ and H′ have a similar graph drawing:

Graph G′, H′

Therefore, there exists an isomorphism between G' and H', meaning G and H are homeomorphic.

=== Mixed graphs ===
The following mixed graphs are homeomorphic. The directed edges are shown to have an intermediate arrow head.

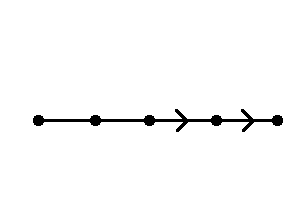
Graph G

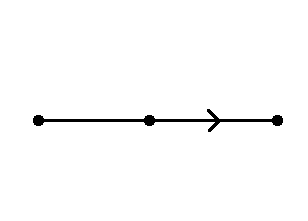
Graph H

== See also ==
- Minor (graph theory)
- Edge contraction
