= Complete bipartite graph =

Bipartite graph where each node of 1st set is linked to all nodes of 2nd set

- A complete bipartite graph with m = 5 and n = 3
- Vertices: n + m
- Edges: mn
- Radius: $\left\{\begin{array}{ll}1 & m = 1 \vee n = 1\\ 2 & \text{otherwise}\end{array}\right.$
- Diameter: $\left\{\begin{array}{ll}1 & m = n = 1\\ 2 & \text{otherwise}\end{array}\right.$
- Girth: $\left\{\begin{array}{ll}\infty & m = 1 \lor n = 1\\ 4 & \text{otherwise}\end{array}\right.$
- Automorphisms: $\left\{\begin{array}{ll}2 m! n! & n = m\\ m! n! & \text{otherwise}\end{array}\right.$
- Chromatic number: 2
- Chromatic index: max{m, n}
- Spectrum: $\left\{0^{n + m - 2}, (\pm\sqrt{nm})^1\right\}$
- Notation: K_{m,n}

In the mathematical field of graph theory, a complete bipartite graph or biclique is a special kind of bipartite graph where every vertex of the first set is connected to every vertex of the second set.

Graph theory itself is typically dated as beginning with Leonhard Euler's 1736 work on the Seven Bridges of Königsberg. However, drawings of complete bipartite graphs were already printed as early as 1669, in connection with an edition of the works of Ramon Llull edited by Athanasius Kircher. Llull himself had made similar drawings of complete graphs three centuries earlier.

== Definition ==
A complete bipartite graph is a graph whose vertices can be partitioned into two subsets V_{1} and V_{2} such that no edge has both endpoints in the same subset, and every possible edge that could connect vertices in different subsets is part of the graph. That is, it is a bipartite graph (V_{1}, V_{2}, E) such that for every two vertices v_{1} ∈ V_{1} and v_{2} ∈ V_{2}, v_{1}v_{2} is an edge in E. A complete bipartite graph with partitions of size |V_{1}| = m and |V_{2}| = n, is denoted K_{m,n}; every two graphs with the same notation are isomorphic.

== Examples ==
The star graphs K_{1,3}, K_{1,4}, K_{1,5}, and K_{1,6}.

A complete bipartite graph of K_{4,7} showing that Turán's brick factory problem with 4 storage sites (yellow spots) and 7 kilns (blue spots) requires 18 crossings (red dots)

- For any k, K_{1,k} is called a star. All complete bipartite graphs which are trees are stars.
  - The graph K_{1,3} is called a claw, and is used to define the claw-free graphs.
- The graph K_{3,3} is called the utility graph. This usage comes from a standard mathematical puzzle in which three utilities must each be connected to three buildings; it is impossible to solve without crossings due to the nonplanarity of K_{3,3}.
- The maximal bicliques found as subgraphs of the digraph of a relation are called concepts. When a lattice is formed by taking meets and joins of these subgraphs, the relation has an Induced concept lattice. This type of analysis of relations is called formal concept analysis.

== Properties ==
Example K_{p, p} complete bipartite graphs
K_{3,3}	K_{4,4}	K_{5,5}
3 edge-colorings	4 edge-colorings	5 edge-colorings
Regular complex polygons of the form 2{4}p have complete bipartite graphs with 2p vertices (red and blue) and p^{2} 2-edges. They also can also be drawn as p edge-colorings.

- Given a bipartite graph, testing whether it contains a complete bipartite subgraph K_{i,i} for a parameter i is an NP-complete problem.
- A planar graph cannot contain K_{3,3} as a minor; an outerplanar graph cannot contain K_{3,2} as a minor (These are not sufficient conditions for planarity and outerplanarity, but necessary). Conversely, every nonplanar graph contains either K_{3,3} or the complete graph K_{5} as a minor; this is Wagner's theorem.
- Every complete bipartite graph. K_{n,n} is a Moore graph and a (n,4)-cage.
- The complete bipartite graphs K_{n,n} and K_{n,n+1} have the maximum possible number of edges among all triangle-free graphs with the same number of vertices; this is Mantel's theorem. Mantel's result was generalized to k-partite graphs and graphs that avoid larger cliques as subgraphs in Turán's theorem, and these two complete bipartite graphs are examples of Turán graphs, the extremal graphs for this more general problem.
- The complete bipartite graph K_{m,n} has a vertex covering number of min{m, n} and an edge covering number of max{m, n}.
- The complete bipartite graph K_{m,n} has a maximum independent set of size max{m, n}.
- The adjacency matrix of a complete bipartite graph K_{m,n} has eigenvalues √nm, −√nm and 0; with multiplicity 1, 1 and n + m − 2 respectively.
- The Laplacian matrix of a complete bipartite graph K_{m,n} has eigenvalues n + m, n, m, and 0; with multiplicity 1, m − 1, n − 1 and 1 respectively.
- A complete bipartite graph K_{m,n} has m^{n−1} n^{m−1} spanning trees.
- A complete bipartite graph K_{m,n} has a maximum matching of size min{m,n}.
- A complete bipartite graph K_{n,n} has a proper n-edge-coloring corresponding to a Latin square.
- Every complete bipartite graph is a modular graph: every triple of vertices has a median that belongs to shortest paths between each pair of vertices.

== See also ==
- Biclique-free graph, a class of sparse graphs defined by avoidance of complete bipartite subgraphs
- Crown graph, a graph formed by removing a perfect matching from a complete bipartite graph
- Complete multipartite graph, a generalization of complete bipartite graphs to more than two sets of vertices
- Biclique attack
