= Graph bandwidth =

Node labeling problem in graph theory

In graph theory, the graph bandwidth problem may be visualized as placing the vertices of a given graph at distinct integer positions along the number line so that the length of the longest edge is minimized. Such placement is called linear graph arrangement, linear graph layout or linear graph placement. It may be formalized as labeling the $n$ vertices $v_i$ of a graph $G$ with distinct integers $f(v_i)$ so that the quantity $\max\{\,| f(v_i) - f(v_j)| : v_iv_j \in E \,\}$ is minimized, where $E$ is the edge set of $G$.

The weighted graph bandwidth problem is a generalization wherein the edges are assigned weights $w_{ij}$ and the cost function to be minimized is the product of weight with length, $\max\{\, w_{ij} |f(v_i) - f(v_j)| : v_iv_j \in E \,\}$.

In terms of matrices, the (unweighted) graph bandwidth is the minimal bandwidth of a symmetric matrix which is an adjacency matrix of the graph. The bandwidth may also be defined as one less than the maximum clique size in a proper interval supergraph of the given graph, chosen to minimize its clique size.

== Bandwidth formulas for some graphs ==
For several families of graphs, the bandwidth $\varphi(G)$ is given by an explicit formula.

The bandwidth of a path graph $P_n$ on $n$ vertices is 1, and the bandwidth of a complete graph $K_m$ is $\varphi(K_n)=n-1$. For the complete bipartite graph $K_{m,n}$,
$$\varphi(K_{m,n}) = \lfloor (m-1)/2\rfloor+n,$$
assuming $m \ge n\ge 1$. As a special case of this formula, the star graph $S_k = K_{k,1}$ on $k+1$ vertices has bandwidth $\varphi(S_{k}) = \lfloor (k-1)/2\rfloor+1$.

For the hypercube graph $Q_n$ on $2^n$ vertices the bandwidth is
$$\varphi(Q_n)=\sum_{m=0}^{n-1} \binom{m}{\lfloor m/2\rfloor}.$$

The bandwidth of the $m\times n$ square grid graph $P_m \times P_n$, that is, the Cartesian product of two path graphs on $m$ and $n$ vertices, is equal to $\min\{m,n\}$.

== Bounds ==
The bandwidth of a graph can be bounded in terms of various other graph parameters. For instance, letting χ(G) denote the chromatic number of G,

$$\varphi(G) \ge \chi(G) - 1;$$

letting diam(G) denote the diameter of G, the following inequalities hold:

$$\lceil (n-1)/\operatorname{diam}(G) \rceil \le \varphi(G) \le n - \operatorname{diam}(G),$$

where $n$ is the number of vertices in $G$.

If a graph G has bandwidth k, then its pathwidth is at most k, and its tree-depth is at most k log(n/k). In contrast, as noted in the previous section, the star graph S_{k}, a structurally very simple example of a tree, has comparatively large bandwidth. Observe that the pathwidth of S_{k} is 1, and its tree-depth is 2.

Some graph families of bounded degree have sublinear bandwidth: if T is a tree of maximum degree at most ∆, then

$$\varphi(T) \le \frac{5n}{\log_\Delta n}.$$

More generally, for planar graphs of bounded maximum degree at most ∆, a similar bound holds:

$$\varphi(G) \le \frac{20n}{\log_\Delta n}.$$

== Computing the bandwidth ==
Both the unweighted and weighted versions are special cases of the quadratic bottleneck assignment problem. The bandwidth problem is NP-hard, even for some special cases. Regarding the existence of efficient approximation algorithms, it is known that the bandwidth is NP-hard to approximate within any constant, and this even holds when the input graphs are restricted to caterpillar trees with maximum hair length 2. For arbitrary graphs with $n$ vertices, the best approximation ratio known is $O(\log^3 n\sqrt{\log\log n})$, using semidefinite programming. For the case of dense graphs, a 3-approximation algorithm is known. On the other hand, a number of polynomially-solvable special cases are known. A heuristic algorithm for obtaining linear graph layouts of low bandwidth is the Cuthill–McKee algorithm. Fast multilevel algorithm for graph bandwidth computation was proposed in.

== Applications ==
The interest in this problem comes from some application areas.

One area is sparse matrix/band matrix handling, and general algorithms from this area, such as Cuthill–McKee algorithm, may be applied to find approximate solutions for the graph bandwidth problem.

Another application domain is in electronic design automation. In standard cell design methodology, typically standard cells have the same height, and their placement is arranged in a number of rows. In this context, graph bandwidth problem models the problem of placement of a set of standard cells in a single row with the goal of minimizing the maximal propagation delay (which is assumed to be proportional to wire length).

== See also ==
- Cutwidth and pathwidth, different NP-complete optimization problems involving linear layouts of graphs.
