= Grace Nikae =

American classical pianist

Grace Nikae (born in Kagoshima, Japan) is an American classical pianist. At the age of 3 months, she moved to Honolulu, Hawaii and grew up in ʻAiea. She was raised by her mother, Kazuko Hashiguchi, who is a teacher. Her uncle, Kosaburo Hashiguchi, is a Japanese mathematician who solved the remaining star height problem.

A child prodigy, Nikae started to learn the piano from her mother at nine months old, and performed her first public performance at age three. At the age of four, she was featured on television performing a concerto by Haydn. Her debut with orchestra came at age eight, when she performed Mozart's Concerto No. 14 KV 449 with the Honolulu Symphony Orchestra. She made her international recital debut in Japan at the age of thirteen.

Upon graduation from Iolani School, Nikae moved to New York City. She continued her music studies with Martin Canin of the Juilliard School, and with Alexander Slobodyanik. She also pursued undergraduate studies in European history at Columbia University. Her awards and prizes include the 2005 Hawaii Music Award in Classical Music, first prize in piano at the 2002 Sorantin International Young Artists Competition, and the 1995 Sterling Scholar Award in Music.

She has performed in halls such as Carnegie Hall, the Concertgebouw (Amsterdam), London's Wigmore Hall, and has toured throughout the United States, Europe, and Japan as a soloist and chamber musician. Nikae is also active as an educator, and regularly gives masterclasses and seminars. She frequently teaches at the Grace Nikae Piano Seminar on Okinoerabu Island, Japan, and also co-founded The Renaissance Academy, a non-profit after-school educational organization in ‘Aiea, Hawaii with her mother.

In 2005 she recorded her debut album, Fantasies, with the solo piano music of Alexander Scriabin, Enrique Granados, Manuel de Falla, and Franz Liszt.

Nikae has resided in New York City and Rotterdam (Netherlands), and currently resides in Madrid (Spain).
