= Cycle rank =

Connectivity measure in graph theory

Five digraphs and their cycle ranks. The first is acyclic, being a DAG, so has a cycle rank of 0. The second and third graphs have the same cycle rank, because there is a point in each where, if removed, the resulting graph is left with no cycles. The fourth has cycle rank 2; it is strongly connected, and it takes the removal of 1 vertex to make it not so. After that, each strongly connected component remaining has cycle rank 1, so the 1 vertex removed initially plus the max rank among the components. The fifth looks similar to the fourth, but since it is not strongly connected, and the maximum cycle rank of its components is 1, it has the same cycle rank as the second and third graphs.

In graph theory, the cycle rank of a directed graph is a digraph connectivity measure proposed first by Eggan and Büchi (Eggan 1963). Intuitively, this concept measures how close a digraph is to a directed acyclic graph (DAG), in the sense that a DAG has cycle rank zero, while a complete digraph of order n with a self-loop at each vertex has cycle rank n. The cycle rank of a directed graph is closely related to the tree-depth of an undirected graph and to the star height of a regular language. It has also found use in sparse matrix computations (see Bodlaender et al. 1995) and logic (Rossman 2008).

== Definition ==
The cycle rank r(G) of a digraph G = (V, E) is inductively defined as follows:

- If G is acyclic, then r(G) = 0.
- If G is strongly connected and E is nonempty, then

$r(G) = 1 + \min_{v\in V} r(G-v),\,$ where $G - v$ is the digraph resulting from deletion of vertex v and all edges beginning or ending at v.

- If G is not strongly connected, then r(G) is equal to the maximum cycle rank among all strongly connected components of G.

The tree-depth of an undirected graph has a very similar definition, using undirected connectivity and connected components in place of strong connectivity and strongly connected components.

== History ==
Cycle rank was introduced by Eggan (1963) in the context of star height of regular languages. It was rediscovered by (Eisenstat & Liu 2005) as a generalization of undirected tree-depth, which had been developed beginning in the 1980s and applied to sparse matrix computations (Schreiber 1982).

== Examples ==
The cycle rank of a DAG is 0, while a complete digraph of order n with a self-loop at each vertex has cycle rank n. Apart from these, the cycle rank of a few other digraphs is known: the undirected path $P_n$ of order n, which possesses a symmetric edge relation and no self-loops, has cycle rank $\lfloor \log n\rfloor$ (McNaughton 1969). For the directed $(m\times n)$-torus $T_{m,n}$, i.e., the cartesian product of two directed circuits of lengths m and n, we have $r(T_{n,n}) = n$ and $r(T_{m,n}) = \min\{m,n\} + 1$ for m ≠ n (Eggan 1963, Gruber & Holzer 2008).

== Computing the cycle rank ==
Computing the cycle rank is computationally hard: Gruber (2012) proves that the corresponding decision problem is NP-complete, even for sparse digraphs of maximum outdegree at most 2. On the positive side, the problem is solvable in time $O(1.9129^n)$ on digraphs of maximum outdegree at most 2, and in time $O^*(2^n)$ on general digraphs. There is an approximation algorithm with approximation ratio $O((\log n)^\frac32)$.

== Applications ==
=== Star height of regular languages ===
The first application of cycle rank was in formal language theory, for studying the star height of regular languages. Eggan (1963) established a relation between the theories of regular expressions, finite automata, and of directed graphs. In subsequent years, this relation became known as Eggan's theorem, cf. Sakarovitch (2009). In automata theory, a nondeterministic finite automaton with ε-moves (ε-NFA) is defined as a 5-tuple, (Q, Σ, δ, q_{0}, F), consisting of

- a finite set of states Q
- a finite set of input symbols Σ
- a set of labeled edges δ, referred to as transition relation: Q × (Σ ∪{ε}) × Q. Here ε denotes the empty word.
- an initial state q_{0} ∈ Q
- a set of states F distinguished as accepting states F ⊆ Q.

A word w ∈ Σ^{*} is accepted by the ε-NFA if there exists a directed path from the initial state q_{0} to some final state in F using edges from δ, such that the concatenation of all labels visited along the path yields the word w. The set of all words over Σ^{*} accepted by the automaton is the language accepted by the automaton A.

When speaking of digraph properties of a nondeterministic finite automaton A with state set Q, we naturally address the digraph with vertex set Q induced by its transition relation. Now the theorem is stated as follows.

Eggan's Theorem: The star height of a regular language L equals the minimum cycle rank among all nondeterministic finite automata with ε-moves accepting L.

Proofs of this theorem are given by Eggan (1963), and more recently by Sakarovitch (2009).

=== Cholesky factorization in sparse matrix computations ===
Another application of this concept lies in sparse matrix computations, namely for using nested dissection to compute the Cholesky factorization of a (symmetric) matrix in parallel. A given sparse $(n\times n)$-matrix M may be interpreted as the adjacency matrix of some symmetric digraph G on n vertices, in a way such that the non-zero entries of the matrix are in one-to-one correspondence with the edges of G. If the cycle rank of the digraph G is at most k, then the Cholesky factorization of M can be computed in at most k steps on a parallel computer with $n$ processors (Dereniowski & Kubale 2004).

== See also ==
- Circuit rank
