= Generalized star-height problem =

Unsolved problem in formal language theory

Unsolved problem in computer science
Can all regular languages be expressed using generalized regular expressions with a limited nesting depth of Kleene stars?
More unsolved problems in computer science

In formal language theory, the generalized star-height problem is the open question whether all regular languages can be expressed using generalized regular expressions with a limited nesting depth of Kleene stars. Here, generalized regular expressions are defined like regular expressions, but with a built-in complement operator. For a regular language, its generalized star height is defined as the minimum nesting depth of Kleene stars needed in order to describe the language by means of a generalized regular expression.

More specifically, it is an open question whether a nesting depth of more than 1 is required, and if so, whether there is an algorithm to determine the minimum required star height.

Regular languages of generalized star-height 0 are also known as star-free languages. A theorem of Schützenberger provides an algebraic characterization of star-free languages by means of aperiodic syntactic monoids. In particular, star-free languages are a proper decidable subclass of regular languages.

== OpenAI Proofs ==
On October 6, 2026, OpenAI released hundreds of proofs to unsolved math problems generated by an internal research model. Among these were proofs that every regular language over a finite alphabet has a generalized star-height of at most thirteen, at most four, and at most three. If confirmed, these proofs resolve that every regular language has a finite generalized star-height. However, the question if every regular language has a generalized star-height of at most two, or at most one, remains open.

== See also ==
- Eggan's theorem and Generalized star height sections of the Star height article
- Star height problem
