= Centered tree =

Tree graph with only one center

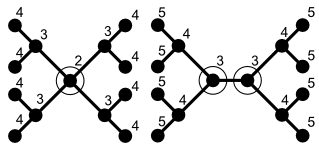
On the left a centered tree, on the right a bicentered one. The numbers show each node's eccentricity.

In the mathematical subfield of graph theory, a centered tree is a tree with only one center, and a bicentered tree is a tree with two centers.

Given a graph, the eccentricity of a vertex v is defined as the greatest distance from v to any other vertex. A center of a graph is a vertex with minimal eccentricity. A graph can have an arbitrary number of centers. However, Jordan (1869) has proved that for trees, there are only two possibilities:

1. The tree has precisely one center (centered trees).
2. The tree has precisely two centers (bicentered trees). In this case, the two centers are adjacent.

A proof of this fact is given, for example, by Harary.
