= Path graph =

Graph with nodes connected linearly

- A path graph on 6 vertices
- Vertices: n
- Edges: n − 1
- Radius: ⌊n/2⌋
- Diameter: n − 1
- Automorphisms: 2
- Chromatic number: 2
- Chromatic index: 2
- Spectrum: $\{2\cos\left(\frac{k\pi}{n+1}\right);$$k=1,\ldots,n\}$
- Properties: Unit distance Bipartite graph Tree
- Notation: P_{n}

In the mathematical field of graph theory, a path graph (or linear graph) is a graph whose vertices can be listed in the order v_{1}, v_{2}, ..., v_{n} such that the edges are {v_{i}, v_{i+1}} where i = 1, 2, ..., n − 1. Equivalently, a path with at least two vertices is connected and has two terminal vertices (vertices of degree 1), while all others (if any) have degree 2.

Paths are often important in their role as subgraphs of other graphs, in which case they are called paths in that graph. A path is a particularly simple example of a tree, and in fact the paths are exactly the trees in which no vertex has degree 3 or more. A disjoint union of paths is called a linear forest.

Paths are fundamental concepts of graph theory, described in the introductory sections of most graph theory texts. See, for example, Bondy and Murty (1976), Gibbons (1985), or Diestel (2005).

== As Dynkin diagrams ==
In algebra, path graphs appear as the Dynkin diagrams of type A. As such, they classify the root system of type A and the Weyl group of type A, which is the symmetric group.

== See also ==
- Path (graph theory)
- Ladder graph
- Caterpillar tree
- Complete graph
- Null graph
- Path decomposition
- Cycle (graph theory)
