= Paul Seymour (mathematician) =

British mathematician

Paul Seymour FRS
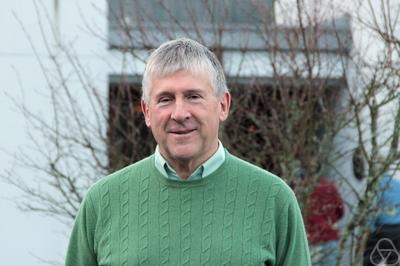
- Seymour at Oberwolfach in 2016
- Born: 1950 (age 75–76); Plymouth, England
- Education: Exeter College, Oxford (BA 1971, DPhil 1975)
- Awards: Sloan Fellowship (1983); Ostrowski Prize (2003); George Pólya Prize (1983, 2004); Fulkerson Prize (1979, 1994, 2006, 2009)
- Scientific career
- Workplaces: University College of Swansea (1974–1976); Merton College, Oxford (1976–1980); University of Waterloo (1978–1979, 1988–1993); Ohio State University (1980–1983); Bellcore (1983–1996); Rutgers University (1984–1987); Princeton University (1996–present)
- Thesis: Matroids, Hypergraphs and the Max-Flow Min-Cut Theorem (1975)
- Doctoral advisor: Aubrey William Ingleton
- Doctoral students: Maria Chudnovsky; Sang-il Oum

Paul D. Seymour FRS (born 1950) is a British mathematician known for his work in discrete mathematics, especially graph theory. He (with others) was responsible for important progress on regular matroids and totally unimodular matrices, the four colour theorem, linkless embeddings, graph minors and structure, the perfect graph conjecture, the Hadwiger conjecture, claw-free graphs, χ-boundedness, and the Erdős–Hajnal conjecture. Many of his recent papers are available from his website.

Seymour is currently the Albert Baldwin Dod Professor of Mathematics at Princeton University. He won a Sloan Fellowship in 1983, and the Ostrowski Prize in 2003; and (sometimes with others) won the Fulkerson Prize in 1979, 1994, 2006 and 2009, and the Pólya Prize in 1983 and 2004. He received an honorary doctorate from the University of Waterloo in 2008, one from the Technical University of Denmark in 2013, and one from the École normale supérieure de Lyon in 2022. He was an invited speaker in the 1986 International Congress of Mathematicians and a plenary speaker in the 1994 International Congress of Mathematicians. He became a Fellow of the Royal Society in 2022.

== Early life ==
Seymour was born in Plymouth, England in 1950. Seymour was a student at Plymouth College, and then studied at Exeter College, Oxford, gaining a BA degree in 1971, MS degree in 1972, and D.Phil and MA in 1975. His doctoral dissertation, Matroids, Hypergraphs and the Max-Flow Min-Cut Theorem, was supervised by Aubrey William Ingleton.

== Career ==
From 1974 to 1976 he was a college research fellow at University College of Swansea. Then he returned to Oxford for 1976–1980 as a Junior Research Fellow at Merton College, Oxford, with the year 1978–79 at University of Waterloo. He became an associate and then a full professor at Ohio State University, Columbus, Ohio, between 1980 and 1983, where he began research with Neil Robertson, a fruitful collaboration that continued for many years. From 1983 until 1996, he was a senior scientist at Bellcore (Bell Communications Research), Morristown, New Jersey (now Telcordia Technologies). He was also an adjunct professor at Rutgers University from 1984 to 1987 and at the University of Waterloo from 1988 to 1993. He became professor at Princeton University in 1996. At Princeton he was given the Albert Baldwin Dod Professorship in 2016.

He is Editor-in-Chief (jointly with Carsten Thomassen) for the Journal of Graph Theory, and an editor for Combinatorica and the Journal of Combinatorial Theory, Series B.

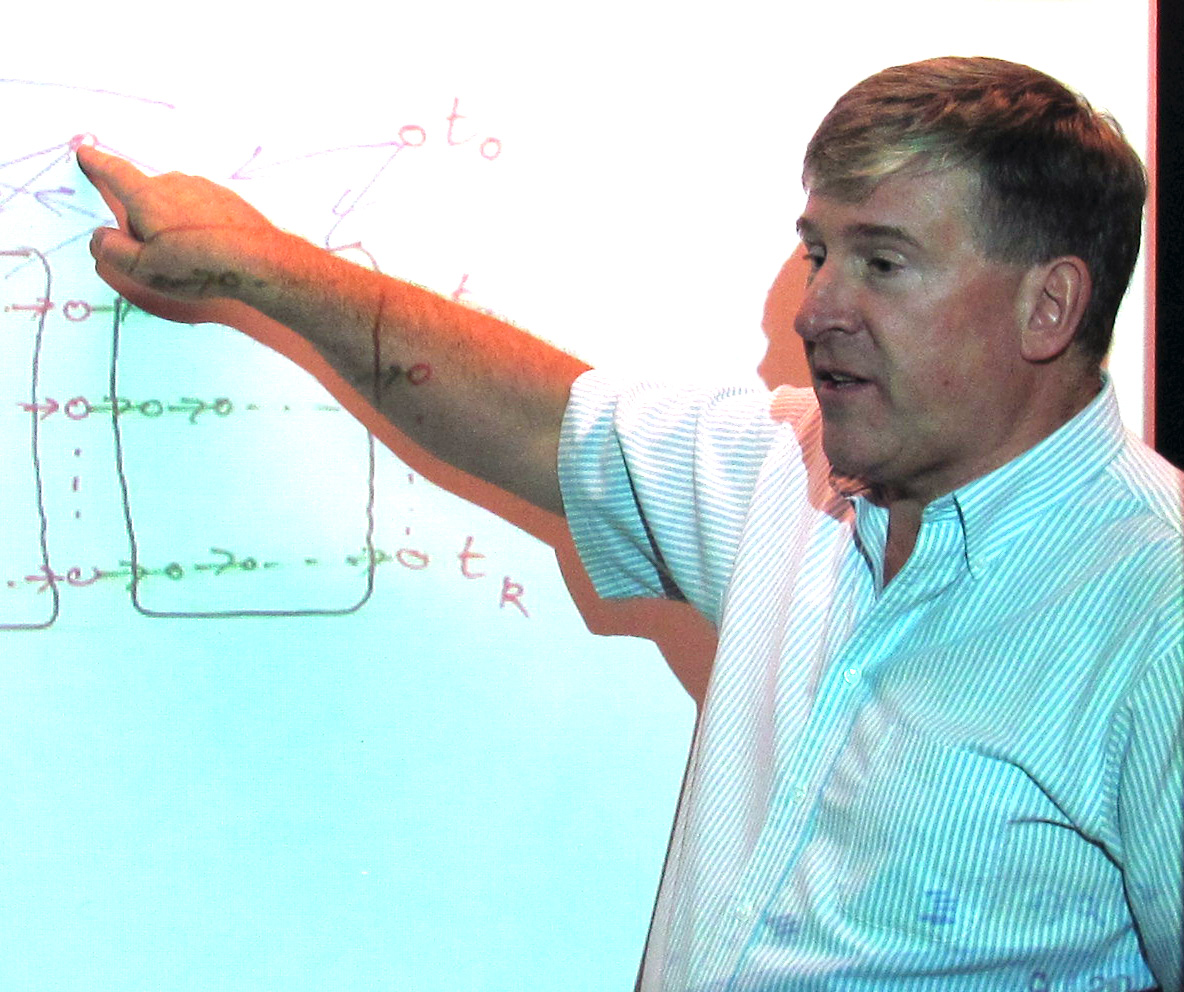
Seymour giving a talk in 2010

== Personal life ==
Seymour's brother Leonard W. Seymour is Professor of gene therapy at Oxford University. In 1979, Seymour got married and had two children.

== Major contributions ==
Combinatorics in Oxford in the 1970s was dominated by matroid theory, due to the influence of Dominic Welsh and Aubrey William Ingleton. Much of Seymour's early work, up to about 1980, was on matroid theory, and included three important matroid results: his D.Phil. thesis on matroids with the max-flow min-cut property (for which he won his first Fulkerson prize); a characterisation by excluded minors of the matroids representable over the three-element field; and a theorem that all regular matroids consist of graphic and cographic matroids, and a special matroid called R_{10}, pieced together in a simple way (which won his first Pólya prize). There were several other significant papers from this period: a paper with Welsh on the critical probabilities for bond percolation on the square lattice; (Note: Seymour, P.D.; Welsh, D.J.A. (1978). "Percolation Probabilities on the Square Lattice". Annals of Discrete Mathematics. 3: 227–245. doi:10.1016/S0167-5060(08)70509-0. ISBN 9780720408430.) a paper on edge-multicolouring of cubic graphs, which foreshadows the matching lattice theorem of László Lovász; a paper proving that all bridgeless graphs admit nowhere-zero 6-flows, a step towards Tutte's nowhere-zero 5-flow conjecture; and a paper solving the two-paths problem (also introducing the cycle double cover conjecture), which was the engine behind much of Seymour's future work.

In 1980 he moved to Ohio State University, and began work with Neil Robertson. This led eventually to Seymour's most important accomplishment, the so-called "Graph Minors Project", a series of 23 papers (joint with Robertson), published over the next thirty years, with several significant results: the graph minors structure theorem, that for any fixed graph, all graphs that do not contain it as a minor can be built from graphs that are essentially of bounded genus by piecing them together at small cutsets in a tree structure; a proof of a conjecture of Wagner that in any infinite set of graphs, one of them is a minor of another (and consequently that any property of graphs that can be characterised by excluded minors can be characterised by a finite list of excluded minors); a proof of a similar conjecture of Nash-Williams that in any infinite set of graphs, one of them can be immersed in another; (Note: Robertson, N.; Seymour, P. (2010). "Graph minors XXIII. Nash-Williams' immersion conjecture". Journal of Combinatorial Theory, Series B. 100 (2): 181–205. CiteSeerX 10.1.1.304.8831. doi:10.1016/j.jctb.2009.07.003.) and polynomial-time algorithms to test if a graph contains a fixed graph as a minor, and to solve the k vertex-disjoint paths problem for all fixed k.

In about 1990 Robin Thomas began to work with Robertson and Seymour. Their collaboration resulted in several important joint papers over the next ten years: a proof of a conjecture of Sachs, characterising by excluded minors the graphs that admit linkless embeddings in 3-space; a proof that every graph that is not five-colourable has a six-vertex complete graph as a minor (the four-colour theorem is assumed to obtain this result, which is a case of Hadwiger's conjecture); with Dan Sanders, a new, simplified, computer based proof of the four-colour theorem; and a description of the bipartite graphs that admit Pfaffian orientations. In the same period, Seymour and Thomas also published several significant results: (with Noga Alon) a separator theorem for graphs with an excluded minor, extending the planar separator theorem of Richard Lipton and Robert Tarjan; a paper characterizing treewidth in terms of brambles; and a polynomial-time algorithm to compute the branch-width of planar graphs.

In 2000, Robertson, Seymour, and Thomas were supported by the American Institute of Mathematics to work on the strong perfect graph conjecture, a famous open question that had been raised by Claude Berge in the early 1960s. Seymour's student Maria Chudnovsky joined them in 2001, and in 2002 the four jointly proved the conjecture. Seymour continued to work with Chudnovsky, and obtained several more results about induced subgraphs, in particular (with Cornuéjols, Liu, and Vušković) a polynomial-time algorithm to test whether a graph is perfect, and a general description of all claw-free graphs. (Note: Chudnovsky, M.; Seymour, P. (2008). "Claw-free graphs. V. Global structure". Journal of Combinatorial Theory, Series B. 98 (6): 1373–1410. CiteSeerX 10.1.1.125.1835. doi:10.1016/j.jctb.2008.03.002.) Other important results in this period include: (with Seymour's student Sang-il Oum) fixed-parameter tractable algorithms to approximate the clique-width of graphs (within an exponential bound) and the branch-width of matroids (within a linear bound); (Note: Oum, S.; Seymour, P. (2006). "Approximating clique-width and branch-width". Journal of Combinatorial Theory, Series B. 96 (4): 514–528. CiteSeerX 10.1.1.139.9829. doi:10.1016/j.jctb.2005.10.006.) and (with Chudnovsky) a proof that the roots of the independence polynomial of every claw-free graph are real. (Note: Chudnovsky, M.; Seymour, P. (2007). "The roots of the independence polynomial of a clawfree graph". Journal of Combinatorial Theory, Series B. 97 (3): 350–357. CiteSeerX 10.1.1.118.3609. doi:10.1016/j.jctb.2006.06.001.)

In the 2010s, Seymour worked mainly on χ-boundedness and the Erdős–Hajnal conjecture. In a series of papers with Alex Scott and partly with Chudnovsky, they proved two conjectures of András Gyárfás, that every graph with bounded clique number and sufficiently large chromatic number has an induced cycle of odd length at least five, and has an induced cycle of length at least any specified number. The series culminated in a paper of Scott and Seymour proving that for every fixed k, every graph with sufficiently large chromatic number contains either a large complete subgraph or induced cycles of all lengths modulo k, which leads to the resolutions of two conjectures of Gil Kalai and Roy Meshulam connecting the chromatic number of a graph with the homology of its independence complex. There was also a polynomial-time algorithm (with Chudnovsky, Scott, and Chudnovsky and Seymour's student Sophie Spirkl) to test whether a graph contains an induced cycle with length more than three and odd. Most recently, the four jointly resolved the 5-cycle case of the Erdős–Hajnal conjecture, which says that every graph without an induced copy of the 5-cycle contains an independent set or a clique of polynomial size.

== See also ==
- Robertson–Seymour theorem
- Strong perfect graph theorem
