= Erdős–Hajnal conjecture =

Conjecture in graph theory

Unsolved problem in mathematics
Do the graphs with a fixed forbidden induced subgraph necessarily have large cliques or large independent sets?
More unsolved problems in mathematics

A claw-free graph with maximum clique highlighted red and maximum independent set highlighted blue

In graph theory, a branch of mathematics, the Erdős–Hajnal conjecture states that families of graphs defined by forbidden induced subgraphs have either large cliques or large independent sets. It is named for Paul Erdős and András Hajnal, who first posed it as an open problem in a paper from 1977.

More precisely, for an arbitrary undirected graph $H$, let $\mathcal{F}_H$ be the family of graphs that do not have $H$ as an induced subgraph. Then, according to the conjecture, there exists a constant $\delta_H > 0$ such that the $n$-vertex graphs in $\mathcal{F}_H$ have either a clique or an independent set of size $\Omega(n^{\delta_H})$. In other words, for any hereditary family $\mathcal{F}$ of graphs that is not the family of all graphs, there exists a constant $\delta_{\mathcal{F}}>0$ such that the $n$-vertex graphs in $\mathcal{F}$ have either a clique or an independent set of size $\Omega(n^{\delta_{\mathcal{F}}})$.

A convenient and symmetric reformulation of the Erdős–Hajnal conjecture is that for every graph $H$, the $H$-free graphs necessarily contain a perfect induced subgraph of polynomial size. This is because every perfect graph necessarily has either a clique or independent set of size proportional to the square root of their number of vertices, and conversely every clique or independent set is itself perfect.

Background on the conjecture can be found in two surveys, one of András Gyárfás and the other of Maria Chudnovsky.

== Graphs without large cliques or independent sets ==
In contrast, for random graphs in the Erdős–Rényi model with edge probability 1/2, both the maximum clique and the maximum independent set are much smaller: their size is proportional to the logarithm of $n$, rather than growing polynomially. Ramsey's theorem proves that no graph has both its maximum clique size and maximum independent set size smaller than logarithmic. Ramsey's theorem also implies the special case of the Erdős–Hajnal conjecture when $H$ itself is a clique or independent set.

== Partial results ==
This conjecture is due to Paul Erdős and András Hajnal, who proved it to be true when $H$ is a cograph. They also showed, for arbitrary $H$, that the size of the largest clique or independent set grows superlogarithmically. More precisely, for every $H$ there is a constant $c$ such that the $n$-vertex $H$-free graphs have cliques or independent sets containing at least $\exp c\sqrt{\log n}$ vertices. The graphs $H$ for which the conjecture is true also include those with four verticies or less, all five-vertex graphs, and any graph that can be obtained from these and the cographs by modular decomposition. As of 2024, however, the full conjecture has not been proven, and remains an open problem.

An earlier formulation of the conjecture, also by Erdős and Hajnal, concerns the special case when $H$ is a 5-vertex cycle graph. This case has been resolved by Maria Chudnovsky, Alex Scott, Paul Seymour, and Sophie Spirkl.

== Relation to the chromatic number of tournaments ==
Alon et al. showed that the following statement concerning tournaments is equivalent to the Erdős–Hajnal conjecture.

Conjecture. For every tournament $T$, there exists $\varepsilon(T) > 0$ and $c >0$ such that for every $T$-free tournament $G$ with $n$ vertices $\chi(G) \leq c \cdot n^{1-\varepsilon}$.

Here $\chi(G)$ denotes the chromatic number of $G$, which is the smallest $k \in \mathbb{N}$ such that there is a $k$-coloring for $G$. A coloring of a tournament $G$ is a mapping $\phi:V(G) \rightarrow \{1, \ldots ,k \}$ such that the color classes $\{v \in V(T): \phi(v) = i \}$ are transitive for all $i = 1, \ldots , k$.

The class of tournaments $H$ with the property that every $H$-free tournament $G$ has $\chi(G) \leq c(H)$ for some constant $c(H)$ satisfies this equivalent Erdős–Hajnal conjecture (with $\varepsilon = 1$). Such tournaments $H$, called heroes, were considered by Berger et al. There it is proven that a hero has a special structure which is as follows:

Theorem. A tournament is a hero if and only if all its strong components are heroes. A strong tournament with more than one vertex is a hero if and only if it equals $\Delta(H,k,1)$ or $\Delta(H,1,k)$ for some hero $H$ and some integer $k \geq 0$.

Here $\Delta(H,k,1)$ denotes the tournament with the three components $H$, the transitive tournament of size $k$ and a single node $q$. The arcs between the three components are defined as follows: $A = \{(v,w) : (v \in H \wedge w \in T_k)\vee (v \in T_k \wedge w = q) \vee (v = q \wedge w \in H) \}$. The tournament $\Delta(H,1,k)$ is defined analogously.
