= Maria Chudnovsky =

Mathematician and engineer

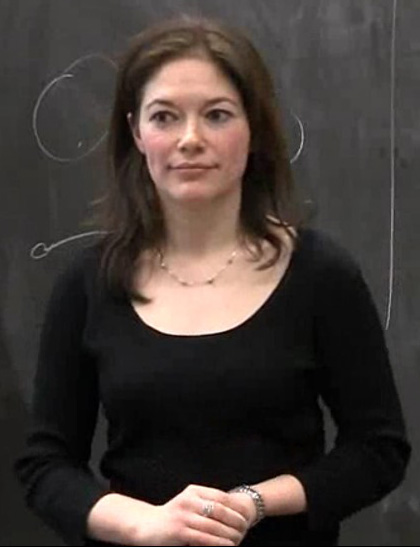
- Chudnovsky in 2011.
- Born: January 6, 1977 (age 49); Leningrad, Soviet Union
- Education: Technion; Princeton University
- Known for: Graph theory, Combinatorial optimization
- Scientific career
- Fields: Mathematics
- Workplaces: Princeton University
- Thesis: Berge Trigraphs and Their Applications. (2005)
- Doctoral advisor: Paul Seymour

Maria Chudnovsky (born January 6, 1977) is an Israeli-American mathematician working on graph theory and combinatorial optimization. She is a 2012 MacArthur Fellow.

== Education and career ==
Chudnovsky is a professor in the department of mathematics at Princeton University. She grew up in Russia (attended Saint Petersburg Lyceum 30) and Israel, studying at the Technion, and received her Ph.D. in 2003 from Princeton University under the supervision of Paul Seymour. After postdoctoral research at the Clay Mathematics Institute, she became an assistant professor at Princeton University in 2005, and moved to Columbia University in 2006. By 2014, she was the Liu Family Professor of Industrial Engineering and Operations Research at Columbia. She returned to Princeton as a professor of mathematics in 2015.

Chudnovsky is an editor for a number of mathematical journals, including Combinatorica, Journal of Combinatorial Theory Series B, Journal of Graph Theory and Proceedings of the London Mathematical Society.

== Research ==
External videos
- Mathematician Maria Chudnovsky: 2012 MacArthur Fellow, MacArthur Foundation

Chudnovsky's contributions to graph theory include the proof of the strong perfect graph theorem (with Neil Robertson, Paul Seymour, and Robin Thomas) characterizing perfect graphs as being exactly the graphs with no odd induced cycles of length at least 5 or their complements. Other research contributions of Chudnovsky include co-authorship of the first polynomial-time algorithm for recognizing perfect graphs (time bounded by a polynomial of degree 9), a structural characterization of the claw-free graphs, and progress on the Erdős–Hajnal conjecture.

== Selected publications ==
- Chudnovsky, Maria; Cornuéjols, Gérard; Liu, Xinming; Seymour, Paul; Vušković, Kristina (2005), "Recognizing Berge graphs", Combinatorica, 25 (2): 143–186, doi:10.1007/s00493-005-0012-8, MR 2127609, S2CID 2229369.
- Chudnovsky, Maria; Seymour, Paul (2005), "The structure of claw-free graphs", Surveys in Combinatorics 2005, London Mathematical Society Lecture Note Series, vol. 327, Cambridge: Cambridge Univ. Press, pp. 153–171, CiteSeerX 10.1.1.112.4130, doi:10.1017/CBO9780511734885.008, ISBN 9780511734885, MR 2187738.
- Chudnovsky, Maria; Robertson, Neil; Seymour, Paul; Thomas, Robin (2006), "The strong perfect graph theorem", Annals of Mathematics, 164 (1): 51–229, arXiv:math/0212070, doi:10.4007/annals.2006.164.51, S2CID 119151552.
- Chudnovsky, Maria; Sivaraman, Vaidy (2018), "Odd Holes in Bull-Free Graphs", SIAM Journal on Discrete Mathematics, 32 (2): 951–955, arXiv:1704.04262, doi:10.1137/17M1131301, MR 3794342, S2CID 1657094

== Awards and honors ==
In 2004 Chudnovsky was named one of the "Brilliant 10" by Popular Science magazine. Her work on the strong perfect graph theorem won for her and her co-authors the 2009 Fulkerson Prize. In 2012 she was awarded a "genius award" under the MacArthur Fellows Program. She was elected as a Fellow of the American Mathematical Society in the 2024 class of fellows. Elected to the National Academy of Science in 2026.

== Personal life ==
In 2011, she married Daniel Panner, a viola player who teaches at Mannes School of Music and Rutgers University. They have a son named Rafael.
