= Leonard W. Seymour =

British professor

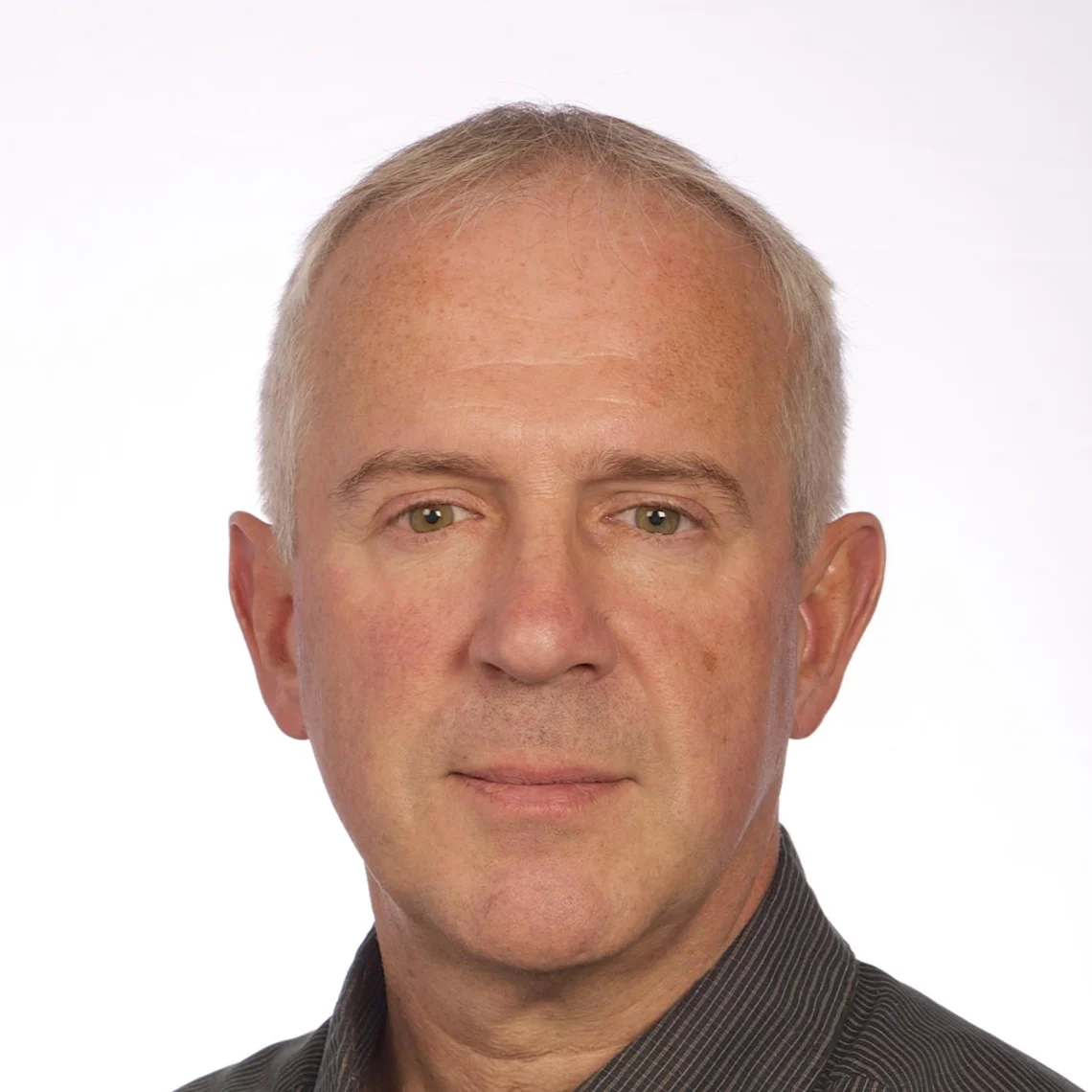
- Born: 1958 (age 67–68); Plymouth, England, UK
- Education: University of Manchester (BSc) Keele University (PhD)
- Known for: Oncolytic Virotherapy
- Scientific career
- Fields: Gene Therapy
- Workplaces: University of Birmingham University of Oxford
- Thesis: The mechanism of transcellular transport of immunoglobulin G in yolk-sac tissue (1985)

Leonard W. Seymour is a Professor of Gene Therapy at the University of Oxford's oncology department. As a cancer-oriented translational researcher, he investigates technologies utilised to enhance targeted therapy's (e.g. drugs, genes, oncolytic virus) delivery and develops related biological therapeutics under the support of Cancer Research UK.

== Early life and education ==
Professor Seymour was born in Plymouth, United Kingdom, in 1958, and was educated at Plymouth College. He later read Biochemistry at the University of Manchester and obtained his PhD from Keele University, submitting a thesis on "The mechanism of transcellular transport of immunoglobulin G in yolk-sac tissue" in 1985.

== Career ==
He later formed a research group focused on gene delivery at the Cancer Research UK Institute in Birmingham, and then relocated to the University of Oxford in 2003 as Gene Therapy lead for the National Translational Cancer Research Network (NTRAC). There, he took part in forming the British Society for Gene Therapy (BSCGT) as a means to build the translational gene and cell therapy community within the UK.

Seymour served as the first President of the BSGCT from 2003 to 2009, currently serves as the General Secretary of the European Society for Gene and Cell Therapy, is indexed in Who's Who, and has produced approximately 140 primary scientific publications, with over 7,000 citations.

With Dr. Kerry Fisher, Prof. Seymour formed a biotech spinout company 'Hybrid Systems' which later became ‘PsiOxus Therapeutics Ltd’, with Cancer Research UK and the University of Birmingham. PsiOxus is now developing a cancer-killing 'oncolytic' group B adenovirus 'ColoAd1' in a series of clinical trials to treat cancer. More recently with Dr. Ryan Cawood, Seymour formed the plasmid expression company OxGENE, aiming to enable major improvements in the efficiency of genetic engineering and synthetic biology. In 2021, OxGENE was sold to WuXi AppTec for $133 million.

== Personal life ==
His brother Paul Seymour is a professor of mathematics at Princeton University.
