= Oum Sang-il =

South Korean mathematician (born 1976)

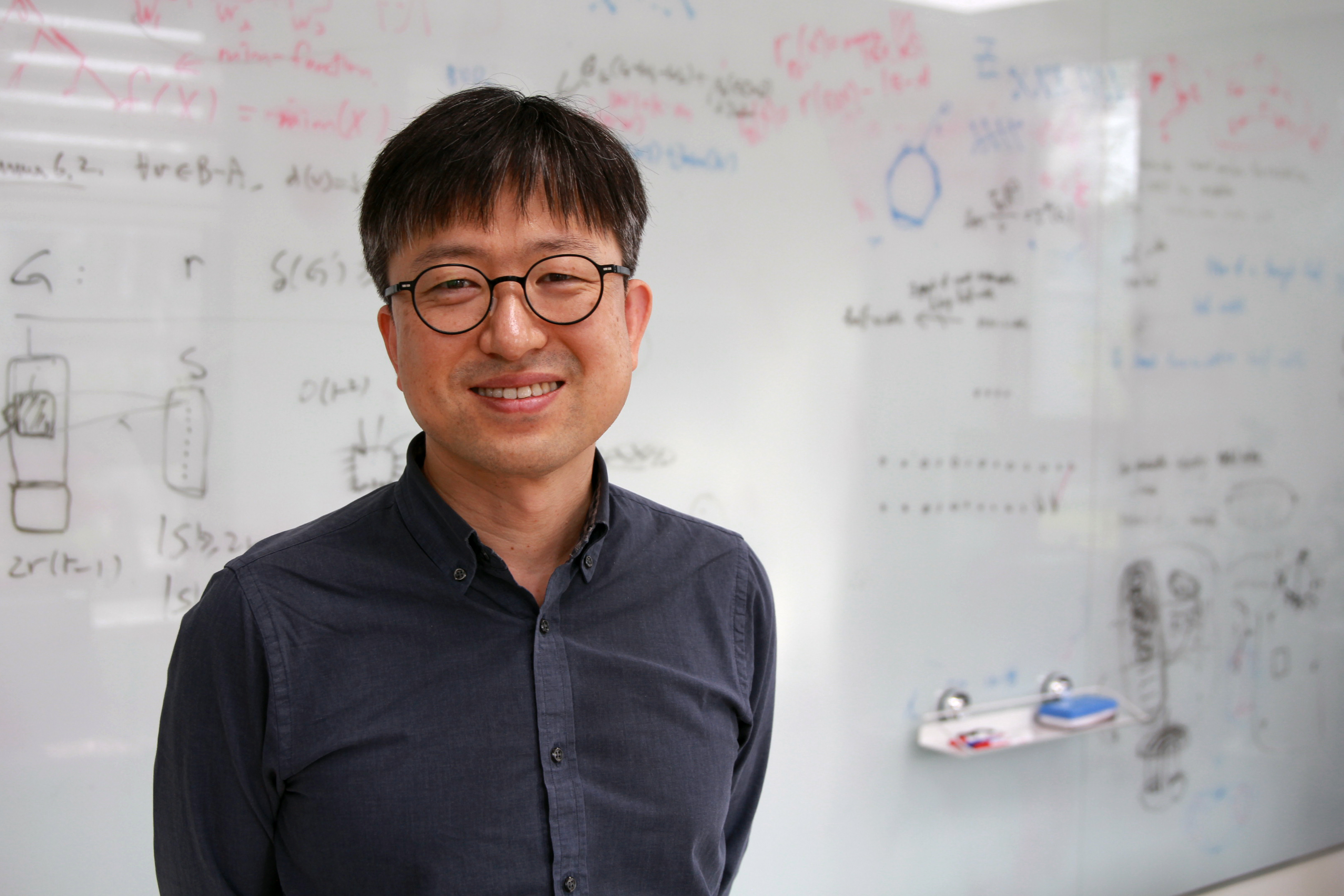
- Born: 1976 (age 49–50); Yecheon County, North Gyeongsang Province, South Korea
- Education: KAIST, Princeton University
- Awards: Excellent Research Paper Award, Excellent Young Researcher Research Award, Young Scientist Award
- Scientific career
- Fields: Graph theory, discrete mathematics
- Workplaces: Georgia Tech, University of Waterloo, KAIST, Institute for Basic Science
- Thesis: Graphs of Bounded Rank-width (2005)
- Doctoral advisor: Paul Seymour

Korean name
- Hangul: 엄상일
- RR: Eom Sangil
- MR: Ŏm Sangil
- Website: Sang-il Oum (엄상일)

Oum Sang-il (Korean: 엄상일; born 1976) is a South Korean mathematician working in graph theory and discrete mathematics. He is a distinguished research fellow and the chief investigator of the Discrete Mathematics Group in the Pioneer Research Center for Mathematical and Computational Sciences at the Institute for Basic Science. He was a tenured professor in the Department of Mathematical Sciences at KAIST. He is known for his work on structural graph theory and in particular for structures and algorithms relating to rank-width, clique-width, and branch-width. He published more than 80 journal papers.

He won the Young Scientist Award from the South Korean government in 2012. and the TJ Park Young Professor Fellowship from the POSCO TJ Park Foundation in 2009. He has been an editor of Graphs and Combinatorics, SIAM Journal on Computing, and Journal of the Korean Mathematical Society and a founding member of Young Korean Academy of Science and Technology.

He wrote a monthly article for the monthly magazine Math Donga for 4 years from 2016, sharing the latest research breakthroughs in mathematics.

In the Korean Mathematical Society, he was appointed twice (2011–2012, 2017–2018) as an executive member of the board of trustees in charge of the Korean Mathematical Olympiad. He was a member of the Korean Mathematical Olympiad Committee for 2011–2018 and was the deputy leader of the South Korean team at the International Mathematical Olympiad in 2012 and 2018.

== Education ==
Born in Yecheon County, Oum attended Daegu Science High School in Daegu from 1992. He then went to KAIST where he majored in mathematics and graduated with a B.S. in 1998. Studying in the Program of Applied and Computational Mathematics of Princeton University, he majored in graph theory and discrete mathematics. His dissertation was overseen by Professor Paul Seymour and Ph.D. was awarded in 2005.

== Career ==
From 1999 to 2002, Oum worked as a computer programmer in Korea. He was a visiting assistant professor in the School of Mathematics, Georgia Tech for 2005–2006 and a postdoctoral fellow under Jim Geelen in the Department of Combinatorics & Optimization in the University of Waterloo in 2007. In 2008, he joined the Department of Mathematical Sciences KAIST as an assistant professor before coming an associate professor and then full professor in 2011 and 2016, respectively. He was an affiliate professor in the School of Mathematics, Korea Institute for Advanced Study for several years. In 2018, he was appointed as the CI (Chief Investigator) of the Discrete Mathematics Group in the Pioneer Research Center for Mathematical and Computational Sciences at the Institute for Basic Science (IBS). This and the Pioneer Research Center for Biomolecular and Cellular Structure are the first of two such centers at IBS.

In 2023, Oum became a KAIST Endowed Chair Professor and the following year resigned from KAIST and became a Distinguished Research Fellow at IBS.

== Awards and honors ==
- 2022: Choi Seok-jeong Award
- 2017: Founding member of Young Korean Academy of Science and Technology
- 2012: Young Scientist Award, President of Korea
- 2011: Excellent Young Researcher Research Award, National Research Foundation of Korea
- 2010: Excellent Research Paper Award, Korean Mathematical Society
- 2009: TJ Park Junior Faculty Fellowship, POSCO TJ Park Foundation
