= Neville Temperley =

British applied mathematician

Harold Neville Vazeille Temperley (4 March 1915 – 27 March 2017), better known as Neville Temperley, was an applied mathematician who made numerous contributions to the fields of statistical mechanics, graph theory and the physics of liquids and gases. He was awarded the title Doctor of Science as a fellow of King's College Cambridge, before working for the Admiralty on numerical modeling of underwater explosions during World War II. He continued his work on the physical properties of liquids at the Atomic Weapons Research Establishment at Aldermaston until 1965.

Temperley was head of the Applied Mathematics Department at Swansea University for 17 years until his retirement in 1982. He received the Rumford Medal from the Royal Society in 1992.

His father, Harold Temperley, was a distinguished British historian. He was the father of Virginia (Wagstaff) Julian, creator of Somerset Cider Brandy, Humphrey of Vignobles Temperley a fine wine producer and former chairman of Somerset County Council and grandfather of: Alice Temperley, fashion designer of London, William Temperley, Mary Temperley, Matilda Temperley, Will Wagstaff, Edward Temperley editor of magicseaweed.com, Kate Temperley, Jane Wagstaff and Henry Temperley. He had nine great grandchildren.

In 2015, Temperley celebrated his 100th birthday. He died on 27 March 2017 at the age of 102.

== Selected publications ==
- Temperley, HNV; Lieb, EH (20 April 1971). "Relations between the 'Percolation' and 'Colouring' Problem and other Graph-Theoretical Problems Associated with Regular Planar Lattices: Some Exact Results for the 'Percolation' Problem". Proceedings of the Royal Society of London. Series A, Mathematical and Physical Sciences. 322 (1549): 251–280. Bibcode:1971RSPSA.322..251T. doi:10.1098/rspa.1971.0067. JSTOR 77727. S2CID 122770421.

== See also ==
- Temperley–Lieb algebra
- FKT algorithm
