= Jin-Yi Cai =

Chinese-American computer scientist

Jin-Yi Cai (Chinese: 蔡进一; born 1961) is a Chinese American mathematician and computer scientist. He is a professor of computer science, and also the Steenbock Professor of Mathematical Sciences at the University of Wisconsin–Madison. His research is in theoretical computer science, especially computational complexity theory. In recent years he has concentrated on the classification of computational counting problems, especially counting graph homomorphisms, counting constraint satisfaction problems, and Holant problems as related to holographic algorithms.

== Early life ==
Cai was born in Shanghai, China. He studied mathematics at Fudan University, graduating in 1981. He earned a master's degree at Temple University in 1983, a second master's degree at Cornell University in 1985, and his Ph.D. from Cornell in 1986, with Juris Hartmanis as his doctoral advisor.

== Academic career ==
He became a faculty member at Yale University (1986-1989), Princeton University (1989-1993), and SUNY Buffalo (1993-2000), rising from Assistant Professor to Full Professor in 1996. He became a Professor of Computer Science at the University of Wisconsin–Madison in 2000.

== Awards ==
Cai was a Presidential Young Investigator, Sloan Research Fellow, and a Guggenheim Fellow. He received a Morningside Silver Medal, and a Humboldt Research Award for Senior U.S. Scientists. He was jointly awarded the Gödel Prize in 2021, an award in theoretical computer science for his work in the paper titled: Complexity of Counting CSP with Complex Weights. He was also awarded the Fulkerson Prize in Discrete Mathematics awarded by the American Mathematical Society and the Mathematical Programming Society.

He was elected a Fellow of the Association for Computing Machinery (2001), American Association for the Advancement of Science (2007), and a foreign member of Academia Europaea (2017). He was named to the 2023 class of Fellows of the American Mathematical Society, "for contributions to computational complexity theory, especially in the areas of complexity dichotomy".
