= Tutte matrix =

In graph theory, the Tutte matrix A of a graph G = (V, E) is a matrix used to determine the existence of a perfect matching: that is, a set of edges which is incident with each vertex exactly once.

If the set of vertices is $V = \{1, 2, \dots , n\}$ then the Tutte matrix is an n-by-n skew-symmetric matrix A with entries

$$A_{ij} = \begin{cases} x_{ij}\;\;\mbox{if}\;(i,j) \in E \mbox{ and } i<j\\
-x_{ji}\;\;\mbox{if}\;(i,j) \in E \mbox{ and } i>j\\
0\;\;\;\;\mbox{otherwise} \end{cases}$$

where the x_{ij} are indeterminates. The determinant of this matrix is then a polynomial (in the variables x_{ij}, i < j ): this coincides with the square of the Pfaffian of the matrix A and is non-zero (as a polynomial) if and only if a perfect matching exists. (This polynomial is not the Tutte polynomial of G.)

The Tutte matrix is named after W. T. Tutte, and is a generalisation of the Edmonds matrix for a balanced bipartite graph.
