= Kristina Vušković =

Serbian mathematician (born 1967)

Kristina L. Vušković (Serbian: Кристина Л. Вушковић, born 6 May 1967) is a Serbian mathematician and theoretical computer scientist working in graph theory. She is Professor in Algorithms and Combinatorics in the School of Computing at the University of Leeds, and a professor of computer science at Union University (Serbia).

== Education and career ==
Vušković was born on 6 May 1967 in Belgrade. She graduated summa cum laude from the Courant Institute of Mathematical Sciences of New York University in 1989, majoring in mathematics and computer science, and completed her PhD in Algorithms, Combinatorics and Optimization at Carnegie Mellon University in 1994. Her dissertation, supervised by Gérard Cornuéjols, was Holes in Bipartite Graphs.

After postdoctoral research as an NSERC Canada International Fellow at the University of Waterloo, she became an assistant professor of mathematics at the University of Kentucky, in 1996. She moved to Leeds in 2000, and was given the chair of algorithms and combinatorics at Leeds in 2011. Since 2007 she has also been a professor of computer science at Union University (Serbia).

== Research ==
Vušković's research in graph theory concerns the structure and algorithms of hereditary classes of graphs. Her results include the recognition of perfect graphs in polynomial time; she has also worked in combinatorial algorithms for graph coloring of perfect graphs.
